

582001–582100 

|-bgcolor=#fefefe
| 582001 ||  || — || March 31, 2012 || Mount Lemmon || Mount Lemmon Survey || H || align=right data-sort-value="0.62" | 620 m || 
|-id=002 bgcolor=#d6d6d6
| 582002 ||  || — || October 26, 2011 || Haleakala || Pan-STARRS ||  || align=right | 1.7 km || 
|-id=003 bgcolor=#d6d6d6
| 582003 ||  || — || May 23, 2014 || Haleakala || Pan-STARRS ||  || align=right | 3.1 km || 
|-id=004 bgcolor=#d6d6d6
| 582004 ||  || — || March 23, 2003 || Kitt Peak || Spacewatch ||  || align=right | 2.9 km || 
|-id=005 bgcolor=#d6d6d6
| 582005 ||  || — || June 17, 2015 || Haleakala || Pan-STARRS ||  || align=right | 2.2 km || 
|-id=006 bgcolor=#d6d6d6
| 582006 ||  || — || February 22, 2014 || Mount Lemmon || Mount Lemmon Survey ||  || align=right | 2.3 km || 
|-id=007 bgcolor=#d6d6d6
| 582007 ||  || — || February 13, 2002 || Apache Point || SDSS Collaboration ||  || align=right | 2.7 km || 
|-id=008 bgcolor=#d6d6d6
| 582008 ||  || — || June 12, 2005 || Kitt Peak || Spacewatch ||  || align=right | 2.6 km || 
|-id=009 bgcolor=#d6d6d6
| 582009 ||  || — || April 1, 2003 || Apache Point || SDSS Collaboration ||  || align=right | 2.8 km || 
|-id=010 bgcolor=#E9E9E9
| 582010 ||  || — || April 10, 2010 || Mount Lemmon || Mount Lemmon Survey ||  || align=right | 1.8 km || 
|-id=011 bgcolor=#d6d6d6
| 582011 ||  || — || February 9, 2013 || Haleakala || Pan-STARRS ||  || align=right | 2.4 km || 
|-id=012 bgcolor=#d6d6d6
| 582012 ||  || — || March 21, 2002 || Kitt Peak || Spacewatch ||  || align=right | 2.4 km || 
|-id=013 bgcolor=#d6d6d6
| 582013 ||  || — || June 28, 2015 || Haleakala || Pan-STARRS ||  || align=right | 2.6 km || 
|-id=014 bgcolor=#E9E9E9
| 582014 ||  || — || June 22, 2015 || Mount Lemmon || Mount Lemmon Survey ||  || align=right | 1.1 km || 
|-id=015 bgcolor=#d6d6d6
| 582015 ||  || — || June 29, 2015 || Haleakala || Pan-STARRS || Tj (2.98) || align=right | 2.5 km || 
|-id=016 bgcolor=#d6d6d6
| 582016 ||  || — || June 26, 2015 || Haleakala || Pan-STARRS || 7:4 || align=right | 3.1 km || 
|-id=017 bgcolor=#d6d6d6
| 582017 ||  || — || June 18, 2015 || Haleakala || Pan-STARRS ||  || align=right | 2.9 km || 
|-id=018 bgcolor=#d6d6d6
| 582018 ||  || — || June 22, 2015 || Haleakala || Pan-STARRS ||  || align=right | 2.4 km || 
|-id=019 bgcolor=#d6d6d6
| 582019 ||  || — || June 18, 2015 || Haleakala || Pan-STARRS ||  || align=right | 2.4 km || 
|-id=020 bgcolor=#d6d6d6
| 582020 ||  || — || June 27, 2015 || Haleakala || Pan-STARRS ||  || align=right | 2.1 km || 
|-id=021 bgcolor=#d6d6d6
| 582021 ||  || — || June 17, 2015 || Haleakala || Pan-STARRS ||  || align=right | 2.1 km || 
|-id=022 bgcolor=#d6d6d6
| 582022 ||  || — || April 15, 2010 || Kitt Peak || Spacewatch ||  || align=right | 2.2 km || 
|-id=023 bgcolor=#d6d6d6
| 582023 ||  || — || April 20, 2015 || Haleakala || Pan-STARRS ||  || align=right | 2.5 km || 
|-id=024 bgcolor=#d6d6d6
| 582024 ||  || — || June 13, 2015 || Haleakala || Pan-STARRS ||  || align=right | 2.3 km || 
|-id=025 bgcolor=#d6d6d6
| 582025 ||  || — || May 14, 2015 || Haleakala || Pan-STARRS ||  || align=right | 3.1 km || 
|-id=026 bgcolor=#d6d6d6
| 582026 ||  || — || June 23, 2015 || Haleakala || Pan-STARRS ||  || align=right | 2.4 km || 
|-id=027 bgcolor=#d6d6d6
| 582027 ||  || — || September 3, 2010 || Mount Lemmon || Mount Lemmon Survey ||  || align=right | 2.4 km || 
|-id=028 bgcolor=#E9E9E9
| 582028 ||  || — || May 26, 2006 || Mount Lemmon || Mount Lemmon Survey ||  || align=right | 2.0 km || 
|-id=029 bgcolor=#d6d6d6
| 582029 ||  || — || September 27, 2011 || Mount Lemmon || Mount Lemmon Survey ||  || align=right | 2.5 km || 
|-id=030 bgcolor=#d6d6d6
| 582030 ||  || — || February 9, 2008 || Mount Lemmon || Mount Lemmon Survey ||  || align=right | 2.3 km || 
|-id=031 bgcolor=#E9E9E9
| 582031 ||  || — || June 16, 2015 || Haleakala || Pan-STARRS ||  || align=right | 1.3 km || 
|-id=032 bgcolor=#E9E9E9
| 582032 ||  || — || June 23, 2015 || Haleakala || Pan-STARRS ||  || align=right | 1.8 km || 
|-id=033 bgcolor=#d6d6d6
| 582033 ||  || — || May 23, 2014 || Haleakala || Pan-STARRS ||  || align=right | 2.7 km || 
|-id=034 bgcolor=#d6d6d6
| 582034 ||  || — || June 11, 2015 || Haleakala || Pan-STARRS ||  || align=right | 2.4 km || 
|-id=035 bgcolor=#d6d6d6
| 582035 ||  || — || May 25, 2015 || Haleakala || Pan-STARRS ||  || align=right | 2.3 km || 
|-id=036 bgcolor=#E9E9E9
| 582036 ||  || — || July 7, 2003 || Kitt Peak || Spacewatch ||  || align=right data-sort-value="0.82" | 820 m || 
|-id=037 bgcolor=#E9E9E9
| 582037 ||  || — || July 9, 2015 || Haleakala || Pan-STARRS ||  || align=right | 1.8 km || 
|-id=038 bgcolor=#d6d6d6
| 582038 ||  || — || September 25, 2011 || Haleakala || Pan-STARRS ||  || align=right | 2.3 km || 
|-id=039 bgcolor=#E9E9E9
| 582039 ||  || — || November 5, 2012 || Haleakala || Pan-STARRS ||  || align=right | 1.5 km || 
|-id=040 bgcolor=#E9E9E9
| 582040 ||  || — || June 25, 2015 || Haleakala || Pan-STARRS ||  || align=right | 2.0 km || 
|-id=041 bgcolor=#d6d6d6
| 582041 ||  || — || January 18, 2012 || Mount Lemmon || Mount Lemmon Survey ||  || align=right | 2.7 km || 
|-id=042 bgcolor=#fefefe
| 582042 ||  || — || July 13, 2015 || Haleakala || Pan-STARRS || H || align=right data-sort-value="0.68" | 680 m || 
|-id=043 bgcolor=#d6d6d6
| 582043 ||  || — || December 31, 2007 || Kitt Peak || Spacewatch ||  || align=right | 2.8 km || 
|-id=044 bgcolor=#d6d6d6
| 582044 ||  || — || July 13, 2015 || Haleakala || Pan-STARRS ||  || align=right | 3.4 km || 
|-id=045 bgcolor=#E9E9E9
| 582045 ||  || — || May 21, 2015 || Haleakala || Pan-STARRS ||  || align=right data-sort-value="0.90" | 900 m || 
|-id=046 bgcolor=#d6d6d6
| 582046 ||  || — || February 21, 2009 || Kitt Peak || Spacewatch ||  || align=right | 3.0 km || 
|-id=047 bgcolor=#E9E9E9
| 582047 ||  || — || July 13, 2015 || Haleakala || Pan-STARRS ||  || align=right data-sort-value="0.96" | 960 m || 
|-id=048 bgcolor=#d6d6d6
| 582048 ||  || — || January 12, 2008 || Kitt Peak || Spacewatch ||  || align=right | 3.1 km || 
|-id=049 bgcolor=#d6d6d6
| 582049 ||  || — || September 24, 2000 || Socorro || LINEAR ||  || align=right | 2.6 km || 
|-id=050 bgcolor=#FA8072
| 582050 ||  || — || August 8, 2012 || Haleakala || Pan-STARRS ||  || align=right data-sort-value="0.21" | 210 m || 
|-id=051 bgcolor=#d6d6d6
| 582051 ||  || — || May 4, 2014 || Haleakala || Pan-STARRS ||  || align=right | 2.7 km || 
|-id=052 bgcolor=#d6d6d6
| 582052 ||  || — || March 5, 2013 || Haleakala || Pan-STARRS ||  || align=right | 3.0 km || 
|-id=053 bgcolor=#d6d6d6
| 582053 ||  || — || February 10, 2008 || Kitt Peak || Spacewatch ||  || align=right | 2.5 km || 
|-id=054 bgcolor=#E9E9E9
| 582054 ||  || — || July 14, 2015 || Haleakala || Pan-STARRS ||  || align=right data-sort-value="0.82" | 820 m || 
|-id=055 bgcolor=#E9E9E9
| 582055 ||  || — || June 13, 2015 || Haleakala || Pan-STARRS ||  || align=right | 1.6 km || 
|-id=056 bgcolor=#d6d6d6
| 582056 ||  || — || June 12, 2015 || Haleakala || Pan-STARRS ||  || align=right | 3.6 km || 
|-id=057 bgcolor=#d6d6d6
| 582057 ||  || — || October 4, 2004 || Kitt Peak || Spacewatch ||  || align=right | 2.9 km || 
|-id=058 bgcolor=#d6d6d6
| 582058 ||  || — || August 10, 2004 || Campo Imperatore || A. Boattini, F. De Luise ||  || align=right | 3.6 km || 
|-id=059 bgcolor=#E9E9E9
| 582059 ||  || — || September 14, 2007 || Catalina || CSS ||  || align=right | 1.2 km || 
|-id=060 bgcolor=#d6d6d6
| 582060 ||  || — || March 31, 2008 || Mount Lemmon || Mount Lemmon Survey ||  || align=right | 2.7 km || 
|-id=061 bgcolor=#E9E9E9
| 582061 ||  || — || March 12, 2005 || Kitt Peak || Spacewatch ||  || align=right | 1.5 km || 
|-id=062 bgcolor=#d6d6d6
| 582062 ||  || — || March 1, 2008 || Kitt Peak || Spacewatch ||  || align=right | 2.7 km || 
|-id=063 bgcolor=#d6d6d6
| 582063 ||  || — || October 6, 2005 || Mount Lemmon || Mount Lemmon Survey ||  || align=right | 2.4 km || 
|-id=064 bgcolor=#d6d6d6
| 582064 ||  || — || April 1, 2014 || Mount Lemmon || Mount Lemmon Survey ||  || align=right | 2.1 km || 
|-id=065 bgcolor=#d6d6d6
| 582065 ||  || — || February 17, 2013 || Mount Lemmon || Mount Lemmon Survey ||  || align=right | 2.6 km || 
|-id=066 bgcolor=#d6d6d6
| 582066 ||  || — || September 18, 2010 || Mount Lemmon || Mount Lemmon Survey ||  || align=right | 2.4 km || 
|-id=067 bgcolor=#d6d6d6
| 582067 ||  || — || February 13, 2013 || Haleakala || Pan-STARRS ||  || align=right | 2.7 km || 
|-id=068 bgcolor=#E9E9E9
| 582068 ||  || — || July 11, 2015 || Haleakala || Pan-STARRS ||  || align=right | 1.3 km || 
|-id=069 bgcolor=#d6d6d6
| 582069 ||  || — || December 31, 2007 || Mount Lemmon || Mount Lemmon Survey ||  || align=right | 2.7 km || 
|-id=070 bgcolor=#d6d6d6
| 582070 ||  || — || April 7, 2008 || Mount Lemmon || Mount Lemmon Survey ||  || align=right | 2.8 km || 
|-id=071 bgcolor=#d6d6d6
| 582071 ||  || — || July 18, 2015 || Haleakala || Pan-STARRS ||  || align=right | 2.5 km || 
|-id=072 bgcolor=#d6d6d6
| 582072 ||  || — || May 23, 2014 || Haleakala || Pan-STARRS ||  || align=right | 3.2 km || 
|-id=073 bgcolor=#d6d6d6
| 582073 ||  || — || May 23, 2014 || Haleakala || Pan-STARRS ||  || align=right | 3.4 km || 
|-id=074 bgcolor=#fefefe
| 582074 ||  || — || March 9, 2005 || Mount Lemmon || Mount Lemmon Survey ||  || align=right data-sort-value="0.55" | 550 m || 
|-id=075 bgcolor=#fefefe
| 582075 ||  || — || March 13, 2010 || Mount Lemmon || Mount Lemmon Survey ||  || align=right data-sort-value="0.94" | 940 m || 
|-id=076 bgcolor=#fefefe
| 582076 ||  || — || December 17, 2012 || ESA OGS || ESA OGS ||  || align=right data-sort-value="0.68" | 680 m || 
|-id=077 bgcolor=#E9E9E9
| 582077 ||  || — || July 13, 2001 || Palomar || NEAT ||  || align=right | 2.2 km || 
|-id=078 bgcolor=#d6d6d6
| 582078 ||  || — || January 2, 2012 || Mount Lemmon || Mount Lemmon Survey ||  || align=right | 3.7 km || 
|-id=079 bgcolor=#d6d6d6
| 582079 ||  || — || February 10, 2008 || Kitt Peak || Spacewatch ||  || align=right | 2.8 km || 
|-id=080 bgcolor=#E9E9E9
| 582080 ||  || — || July 24, 2015 || Haleakala || Pan-STARRS ||  || align=right | 1.6 km || 
|-id=081 bgcolor=#d6d6d6
| 582081 ||  || — || March 5, 2008 || Kitt Peak || Spacewatch ||  || align=right | 3.9 km || 
|-id=082 bgcolor=#E9E9E9
| 582082 ||  || — || January 23, 2006 || Kitt Peak || Spacewatch ||  || align=right data-sort-value="0.96" | 960 m || 
|-id=083 bgcolor=#d6d6d6
| 582083 ||  || — || January 6, 2013 || Kitt Peak || Spacewatch ||  || align=right | 3.5 km || 
|-id=084 bgcolor=#d6d6d6
| 582084 ||  || — || September 2, 2010 || Mount Lemmon || Mount Lemmon Survey ||  || align=right | 2.0 km || 
|-id=085 bgcolor=#d6d6d6
| 582085 ||  || — || September 17, 2010 || Mount Lemmon || Mount Lemmon Survey ||  || align=right | 3.1 km || 
|-id=086 bgcolor=#d6d6d6
| 582086 ||  || — || September 30, 2010 || Mount Lemmon || Mount Lemmon Survey ||  || align=right | 2.9 km || 
|-id=087 bgcolor=#d6d6d6
| 582087 ||  || — || March 29, 2008 || Kitt Peak || Spacewatch ||  || align=right | 3.0 km || 
|-id=088 bgcolor=#d6d6d6
| 582088 ||  || — || May 7, 2014 || Haleakala || Pan-STARRS ||  || align=right | 2.7 km || 
|-id=089 bgcolor=#d6d6d6
| 582089 ||  || — || July 2, 2014 || Haleakala || Pan-STARRS ||  || align=right | 2.9 km || 
|-id=090 bgcolor=#d6d6d6
| 582090 ||  || — || July 26, 2015 || Haleakala || Pan-STARRS ||  || align=right | 2.4 km || 
|-id=091 bgcolor=#d6d6d6
| 582091 ||  || — || May 4, 2014 || Mount Lemmon || Mount Lemmon Survey ||  || align=right | 2.0 km || 
|-id=092 bgcolor=#d6d6d6
| 582092 ||  || — || September 11, 2004 || Kitt Peak || Spacewatch ||  || align=right | 2.5 km || 
|-id=093 bgcolor=#d6d6d6
| 582093 ||  || — || July 27, 2015 || Haleakala || Pan-STARRS ||  || align=right | 2.7 km || 
|-id=094 bgcolor=#d6d6d6
| 582094 ||  || — || May 23, 2014 || Haleakala || Pan-STARRS ||  || align=right | 2.9 km || 
|-id=095 bgcolor=#d6d6d6
| 582095 ||  || — || April 29, 2014 || Haleakala || Pan-STARRS ||  || align=right | 2.7 km || 
|-id=096 bgcolor=#d6d6d6
| 582096 ||  || — || July 23, 2015 || Haleakala || Pan-STARRS ||  || align=right | 2.3 km || 
|-id=097 bgcolor=#d6d6d6
| 582097 ||  || — || March 26, 2014 || Mount Lemmon || Mount Lemmon Survey ||  || align=right | 2.8 km || 
|-id=098 bgcolor=#d6d6d6
| 582098 ||  || — || April 24, 2014 || Haleakala || Pan-STARRS ||  || align=right | 2.3 km || 
|-id=099 bgcolor=#d6d6d6
| 582099 ||  || — || November 1, 2010 || Mount Lemmon || Mount Lemmon Survey ||  || align=right | 3.2 km || 
|-id=100 bgcolor=#d6d6d6
| 582100 ||  || — || May 7, 2014 || Haleakala || Pan-STARRS ||  || align=right | 2.2 km || 
|}

582101–582200 

|-bgcolor=#d6d6d6
| 582101 ||  || — || July 23, 2015 || Haleakala || Pan-STARRS ||  || align=right | 2.7 km || 
|-id=102 bgcolor=#d6d6d6
| 582102 ||  || — || July 24, 2015 || Haleakala || Pan-STARRS ||  || align=right | 2.4 km || 
|-id=103 bgcolor=#d6d6d6
| 582103 ||  || — || February 5, 2013 || Kitt Peak || Spacewatch ||  || align=right | 2.0 km || 
|-id=104 bgcolor=#d6d6d6
| 582104 ||  || — || July 24, 2015 || Haleakala || Pan-STARRS ||  || align=right | 2.0 km || 
|-id=105 bgcolor=#E9E9E9
| 582105 ||  || — || October 30, 2011 || Ka-Dar || V. Gerke ||  || align=right | 1.6 km || 
|-id=106 bgcolor=#d6d6d6
| 582106 ||  || — || August 12, 2010 || Kitt Peak || Spacewatch ||  || align=right | 2.0 km || 
|-id=107 bgcolor=#d6d6d6
| 582107 ||  || — || February 13, 2002 || Apache Point || SDSS Collaboration ||  || align=right | 2.5 km || 
|-id=108 bgcolor=#E9E9E9
| 582108 ||  || — || November 24, 2016 || Mount Lemmon || Mount Lemmon Survey ||  || align=right | 1.8 km || 
|-id=109 bgcolor=#E9E9E9
| 582109 ||  || — || April 9, 2014 || Mount Lemmon || Mount Lemmon Survey ||  || align=right | 1.7 km || 
|-id=110 bgcolor=#d6d6d6
| 582110 ||  || — || July 19, 2015 || Haleakala || Pan-STARRS ||  || align=right | 2.1 km || 
|-id=111 bgcolor=#d6d6d6
| 582111 ||  || — || July 24, 2015 || Haleakala || Pan-STARRS || 7:4 || align=right | 3.1 km || 
|-id=112 bgcolor=#E9E9E9
| 582112 ||  || — || July 28, 2015 || Haleakala || Pan-STARRS ||  || align=right | 1.5 km || 
|-id=113 bgcolor=#d6d6d6
| 582113 ||  || — || July 25, 2015 || Haleakala || Pan-STARRS || Tj (2.99) || align=right | 2.2 km || 
|-id=114 bgcolor=#d6d6d6
| 582114 ||  || — || July 25, 2015 || Haleakala || Pan-STARRS ||  || align=right | 2.7 km || 
|-id=115 bgcolor=#d6d6d6
| 582115 ||  || — || July 25, 2015 || Haleakala || Pan-STARRS ||  || align=right | 2.4 km || 
|-id=116 bgcolor=#d6d6d6
| 582116 ||  || — || July 24, 2015 || Haleakala || Pan-STARRS ||  || align=right | 2.3 km || 
|-id=117 bgcolor=#d6d6d6
| 582117 ||  || — || July 23, 2015 || Haleakala || Pan-STARRS ||  || align=right | 1.9 km || 
|-id=118 bgcolor=#E9E9E9
| 582118 ||  || — || July 24, 2015 || Haleakala || Pan-STARRS ||  || align=right data-sort-value="0.78" | 780 m || 
|-id=119 bgcolor=#d6d6d6
| 582119 ||  || — || August 5, 2015 || Haleakala || Pan-STARRS ||  || align=right | 1.9 km || 
|-id=120 bgcolor=#E9E9E9
| 582120 ||  || — || August 27, 2003 || Palomar || NEAT ||  || align=right | 1.4 km || 
|-id=121 bgcolor=#d6d6d6
| 582121 ||  || — || August 22, 1995 || Kitt Peak || Spacewatch ||  || align=right | 2.7 km || 
|-id=122 bgcolor=#d6d6d6
| 582122 ||  || — || November 24, 2011 || Haleakala || Pan-STARRS ||  || align=right | 3.7 km || 
|-id=123 bgcolor=#d6d6d6
| 582123 ||  || — || May 6, 2014 || Haleakala || Pan-STARRS ||  || align=right | 2.8 km || 
|-id=124 bgcolor=#d6d6d6
| 582124 ||  || — || September 5, 2010 || Mount Lemmon || Mount Lemmon Survey ||  || align=right | 2.4 km || 
|-id=125 bgcolor=#fefefe
| 582125 ||  || — || October 12, 2009 || Mount Lemmon || Mount Lemmon Survey ||  || align=right data-sort-value="0.57" | 570 m || 
|-id=126 bgcolor=#d6d6d6
| 582126 ||  || — || January 3, 2012 || Mount Lemmon || Mount Lemmon Survey ||  || align=right | 2.9 km || 
|-id=127 bgcolor=#d6d6d6
| 582127 ||  || — || January 19, 2013 || Mount Lemmon || Mount Lemmon Survey ||  || align=right | 2.5 km || 
|-id=128 bgcolor=#d6d6d6
| 582128 ||  || — || November 11, 2010 || Kitt Peak || Spacewatch ||  || align=right | 3.2 km || 
|-id=129 bgcolor=#d6d6d6
| 582129 ||  || — || July 16, 2010 || WISE || WISE ||  || align=right | 2.8 km || 
|-id=130 bgcolor=#d6d6d6
| 582130 ||  || — || March 10, 2008 || Kitt Peak || Spacewatch ||  || align=right | 2.9 km || 
|-id=131 bgcolor=#d6d6d6
| 582131 ||  || — || October 1, 2005 || Mount Lemmon || Mount Lemmon Survey || 7:4 || align=right | 3.9 km || 
|-id=132 bgcolor=#d6d6d6
| 582132 ||  || — || February 24, 2008 || Mount Lemmon || Mount Lemmon Survey ||  || align=right | 3.1 km || 
|-id=133 bgcolor=#d6d6d6
| 582133 ||  || — || April 20, 2014 || Mount Lemmon || Mount Lemmon Survey ||  || align=right | 3.2 km || 
|-id=134 bgcolor=#d6d6d6
| 582134 ||  || — || February 17, 2013 || Mount Lemmon || Mount Lemmon Survey ||  || align=right | 2.6 km || 
|-id=135 bgcolor=#d6d6d6
| 582135 ||  || — || July 18, 2015 || Haleakala || Pan-STARRS || Tj (2.98) || align=right | 2.3 km || 
|-id=136 bgcolor=#d6d6d6
| 582136 ||  || — || March 31, 2008 || Kitt Peak || Spacewatch ||  || align=right | 2.8 km || 
|-id=137 bgcolor=#d6d6d6
| 582137 ||  || — || August 8, 2015 || Haleakala || Pan-STARRS ||  || align=right | 2.9 km || 
|-id=138 bgcolor=#d6d6d6
| 582138 ||  || — || May 7, 2014 || Haleakala || Pan-STARRS ||  || align=right | 3.1 km || 
|-id=139 bgcolor=#E9E9E9
| 582139 ||  || — || June 25, 2015 || Haleakala || Pan-STARRS ||  || align=right | 2.0 km || 
|-id=140 bgcolor=#d6d6d6
| 582140 ||  || — || March 5, 2008 || Mount Lemmon || Mount Lemmon Survey ||  || align=right | 2.3 km || 
|-id=141 bgcolor=#E9E9E9
| 582141 ||  || — || September 13, 2007 || Mount Lemmon || Mount Lemmon Survey ||  || align=right data-sort-value="0.98" | 980 m || 
|-id=142 bgcolor=#d6d6d6
| 582142 ||  || — || February 15, 2013 || ESA OGS || ESA OGS ||  || align=right | 2.7 km || 
|-id=143 bgcolor=#d6d6d6
| 582143 ||  || — || April 30, 2014 || Haleakala || Pan-STARRS ||  || align=right | 1.8 km || 
|-id=144 bgcolor=#E9E9E9
| 582144 ||  || — || June 25, 2015 || Haleakala || Pan-STARRS ||  || align=right data-sort-value="0.94" | 940 m || 
|-id=145 bgcolor=#d6d6d6
| 582145 ||  || — || May 7, 2014 || Haleakala || Pan-STARRS ||  || align=right | 2.0 km || 
|-id=146 bgcolor=#E9E9E9
| 582146 ||  || — || November 19, 2003 || Kitt Peak || Spacewatch ||  || align=right | 1.5 km || 
|-id=147 bgcolor=#E9E9E9
| 582147 ||  || — || May 7, 2014 || Haleakala || Pan-STARRS ||  || align=right | 1.4 km || 
|-id=148 bgcolor=#d6d6d6
| 582148 ||  || — || August 9, 2015 || Haleakala || Pan-STARRS ||  || align=right | 2.4 km || 
|-id=149 bgcolor=#E9E9E9
| 582149 ||  || — || December 23, 2012 || Haleakala || Pan-STARRS ||  || align=right | 1.3 km || 
|-id=150 bgcolor=#fefefe
| 582150 ||  || — || June 29, 2015 || Haleakala || Pan-STARRS || H || align=right data-sort-value="0.54" | 540 m || 
|-id=151 bgcolor=#d6d6d6
| 582151 ||  || — || January 19, 2012 || Catalina || CSS ||  || align=right | 3.0 km || 
|-id=152 bgcolor=#d6d6d6
| 582152 ||  || — || March 6, 2008 || Mount Lemmon || Mount Lemmon Survey ||  || align=right | 2.4 km || 
|-id=153 bgcolor=#d6d6d6
| 582153 ||  || — || October 1, 2005 || Kitt Peak || Spacewatch ||  || align=right | 2.3 km || 
|-id=154 bgcolor=#d6d6d6
| 582154 ||  || — || April 5, 2014 || Haleakala || Pan-STARRS ||  || align=right | 2.3 km || 
|-id=155 bgcolor=#d6d6d6
| 582155 ||  || — || August 23, 2004 || Kitt Peak || Spacewatch ||  || align=right | 3.1 km || 
|-id=156 bgcolor=#d6d6d6
| 582156 ||  || — || September 30, 2010 || Mount Lemmon || Mount Lemmon Survey ||  || align=right | 2.2 km || 
|-id=157 bgcolor=#d6d6d6
| 582157 ||  || — || June 26, 2015 || Haleakala || Pan-STARRS ||  || align=right | 2.7 km || 
|-id=158 bgcolor=#E9E9E9
| 582158 ||  || — || February 26, 2009 || Kitt Peak || Spacewatch ||  || align=right | 2.2 km || 
|-id=159 bgcolor=#d6d6d6
| 582159 ||  || — || April 11, 2008 || Mount Lemmon || Mount Lemmon Survey ||  || align=right | 2.4 km || 
|-id=160 bgcolor=#d6d6d6
| 582160 ||  || — || January 1, 2012 || Mount Lemmon || Mount Lemmon Survey ||  || align=right | 2.5 km || 
|-id=161 bgcolor=#E9E9E9
| 582161 ||  || — || July 14, 2015 || Haleakala || Pan-STARRS ||  || align=right | 1.2 km || 
|-id=162 bgcolor=#d6d6d6
| 582162 ||  || — || April 23, 2014 || Cerro Tololo-DECam || CTIO-DECam ||  || align=right | 1.6 km || 
|-id=163 bgcolor=#d6d6d6
| 582163 ||  || — || July 18, 2015 || Haleakala || Pan-STARRS ||  || align=right | 2.1 km || 
|-id=164 bgcolor=#d6d6d6
| 582164 ||  || — || September 11, 2010 || Mount Lemmon || Mount Lemmon Survey ||  || align=right | 2.9 km || 
|-id=165 bgcolor=#d6d6d6
| 582165 ||  || — || April 8, 2014 || Mount Lemmon || Mount Lemmon Survey ||  || align=right | 2.4 km || 
|-id=166 bgcolor=#d6d6d6
| 582166 ||  || — || September 18, 2010 || Mount Lemmon || Mount Lemmon Survey ||  || align=right | 2.6 km || 
|-id=167 bgcolor=#fefefe
| 582167 ||  || — || March 10, 2008 || Kitt Peak || Spacewatch ||  || align=right data-sort-value="0.57" | 570 m || 
|-id=168 bgcolor=#fefefe
| 582168 ||  || — || December 1, 1996 || Kitt Peak || Spacewatch ||  || align=right data-sort-value="0.67" | 670 m || 
|-id=169 bgcolor=#d6d6d6
| 582169 ||  || — || April 21, 2014 || Mount Lemmon || Mount Lemmon Survey ||  || align=right | 2.3 km || 
|-id=170 bgcolor=#E9E9E9
| 582170 ||  || — || July 27, 2015 || Haleakala || Pan-STARRS ||  || align=right | 1.8 km || 
|-id=171 bgcolor=#d6d6d6
| 582171 ||  || — || May 4, 2014 || Mount Lemmon || Mount Lemmon Survey ||  || align=right | 2.3 km || 
|-id=172 bgcolor=#d6d6d6
| 582172 ||  || — || April 22, 2009 || Mount Lemmon || Mount Lemmon Survey ||  || align=right | 1.8 km || 
|-id=173 bgcolor=#E9E9E9
| 582173 ||  || — || July 19, 2015 || Haleakala || Pan-STARRS ||  || align=right | 1.7 km || 
|-id=174 bgcolor=#d6d6d6
| 582174 ||  || — || March 19, 2013 || Haleakala || Pan-STARRS ||  || align=right | 2.8 km || 
|-id=175 bgcolor=#d6d6d6
| 582175 ||  || — || December 16, 2011 || Haleakala || Pan-STARRS ||  || align=right | 2.6 km || 
|-id=176 bgcolor=#d6d6d6
| 582176 ||  || — || January 9, 2007 || Kitt Peak || Spacewatch ||  || align=right | 2.5 km || 
|-id=177 bgcolor=#fefefe
| 582177 ||  || — || September 25, 2012 || Mount Lemmon || Mount Lemmon Survey ||  || align=right data-sort-value="0.57" | 570 m || 
|-id=178 bgcolor=#fefefe
| 582178 ||  || — || January 28, 2011 || Kitt Peak || Spacewatch ||  || align=right data-sort-value="0.64" | 640 m || 
|-id=179 bgcolor=#d6d6d6
| 582179 ||  || — || August 10, 2015 || Haleakala || Pan-STARRS ||  || align=right | 2.9 km || 
|-id=180 bgcolor=#d6d6d6
| 582180 ||  || — || May 23, 2014 || Haleakala || Pan-STARRS ||  || align=right | 2.8 km || 
|-id=181 bgcolor=#d6d6d6
| 582181 ||  || — || July 25, 2015 || Haleakala || Pan-STARRS ||  || align=right | 2.0 km || 
|-id=182 bgcolor=#d6d6d6
| 582182 ||  || — || August 10, 2015 || Haleakala || Pan-STARRS ||  || align=right | 2.4 km || 
|-id=183 bgcolor=#d6d6d6
| 582183 ||  || — || August 10, 2015 || Haleakala || Pan-STARRS || 7:4 || align=right | 2.7 km || 
|-id=184 bgcolor=#E9E9E9
| 582184 ||  || — || January 22, 2013 || Kitt Peak || Spacewatch ||  || align=right | 1.3 km || 
|-id=185 bgcolor=#fefefe
| 582185 ||  || — || January 25, 2014 || Haleakala || Pan-STARRS ||  || align=right data-sort-value="0.50" | 500 m || 
|-id=186 bgcolor=#d6d6d6
| 582186 ||  || — || July 24, 2015 || Haleakala || Pan-STARRS ||  || align=right | 1.9 km || 
|-id=187 bgcolor=#d6d6d6
| 582187 ||  || — || June 25, 2015 || Haleakala || Pan-STARRS ||  || align=right | 2.8 km || 
|-id=188 bgcolor=#fefefe
| 582188 ||  || — || December 24, 2006 || Kitt Peak || Spacewatch ||  || align=right data-sort-value="0.57" | 570 m || 
|-id=189 bgcolor=#d6d6d6
| 582189 ||  || — || August 10, 2015 || Haleakala || Pan-STARRS ||  || align=right | 1.6 km || 
|-id=190 bgcolor=#d6d6d6
| 582190 ||  || — || November 28, 2011 || Mount Lemmon || Mount Lemmon Survey || 7:4 || align=right | 3.5 km || 
|-id=191 bgcolor=#d6d6d6
| 582191 ||  || — || August 28, 2005 || Kitt Peak || Spacewatch ||  || align=right | 2.3 km || 
|-id=192 bgcolor=#d6d6d6
| 582192 ||  || — || March 8, 2013 || Haleakala || Pan-STARRS || 7:4 || align=right | 2.5 km || 
|-id=193 bgcolor=#d6d6d6
| 582193 ||  || — || May 6, 2014 || Haleakala || Pan-STARRS ||  || align=right | 2.4 km || 
|-id=194 bgcolor=#d6d6d6
| 582194 ||  || — || July 24, 2015 || Haleakala || Pan-STARRS ||  || align=right | 3.5 km || 
|-id=195 bgcolor=#E9E9E9
| 582195 ||  || — || April 5, 2014 || Haleakala || Pan-STARRS ||  || align=right | 1.1 km || 
|-id=196 bgcolor=#d6d6d6
| 582196 ||  || — || June 23, 2014 || Mount Lemmon || Mount Lemmon Survey ||  || align=right | 2.9 km || 
|-id=197 bgcolor=#d6d6d6
| 582197 ||  || — || October 14, 2010 || Bergisch Gladbach || W. Bickel ||  || align=right | 2.9 km || 
|-id=198 bgcolor=#d6d6d6
| 582198 ||  || — || July 2, 2014 || Haleakala || Pan-STARRS ||  || align=right | 2.8 km || 
|-id=199 bgcolor=#d6d6d6
| 582199 ||  || — || July 24, 2015 || Haleakala || Pan-STARRS ||  || align=right | 2.4 km || 
|-id=200 bgcolor=#d6d6d6
| 582200 ||  || — || October 29, 2005 || Mount Lemmon || Mount Lemmon Survey ||  || align=right | 3.0 km || 
|}

582201–582300 

|-bgcolor=#d6d6d6
| 582201 ||  || — || February 9, 2013 || Haleakala || Pan-STARRS ||  || align=right | 3.6 km || 
|-id=202 bgcolor=#d6d6d6
| 582202 ||  || — || August 10, 2015 || Haleakala || Pan-STARRS ||  || align=right | 2.2 km || 
|-id=203 bgcolor=#d6d6d6
| 582203 ||  || — || November 18, 2011 || Mount Lemmon || Mount Lemmon Survey ||  || align=right | 3.1 km || 
|-id=204 bgcolor=#d6d6d6
| 582204 ||  || — || July 17, 2010 || WISE || WISE ||  || align=right | 2.6 km || 
|-id=205 bgcolor=#d6d6d6
| 582205 ||  || — || February 13, 2008 || Kitt Peak || Spacewatch ||  || align=right | 3.1 km || 
|-id=206 bgcolor=#E9E9E9
| 582206 ||  || — || May 11, 2010 || Mount Lemmon || Mount Lemmon Survey ||  || align=right | 1.1 km || 
|-id=207 bgcolor=#d6d6d6
| 582207 ||  || — || January 10, 2007 || Kitt Peak || Spacewatch ||  || align=right | 2.8 km || 
|-id=208 bgcolor=#d6d6d6
| 582208 ||  || — || December 18, 2007 || Mount Lemmon || Mount Lemmon Survey ||  || align=right | 2.4 km || 
|-id=209 bgcolor=#d6d6d6
| 582209 ||  || — || April 5, 2014 || Haleakala || Pan-STARRS ||  || align=right | 1.9 km || 
|-id=210 bgcolor=#d6d6d6
| 582210 ||  || — || June 27, 2004 || Kitt Peak || Spacewatch ||  || align=right | 2.2 km || 
|-id=211 bgcolor=#d6d6d6
| 582211 ||  || — || January 27, 2007 || Mount Lemmon || Mount Lemmon Survey ||  || align=right | 3.1 km || 
|-id=212 bgcolor=#d6d6d6
| 582212 ||  || — || February 6, 2013 || Kitt Peak || Spacewatch ||  || align=right | 3.0 km || 
|-id=213 bgcolor=#d6d6d6
| 582213 ||  || — || August 11, 2015 || Haleakala || Pan-STARRS ||  || align=right | 2.4 km || 
|-id=214 bgcolor=#d6d6d6
| 582214 ||  || — || January 26, 2012 || Mount Lemmon || Mount Lemmon Survey || 7:4 || align=right | 2.9 km || 
|-id=215 bgcolor=#E9E9E9
| 582215 ||  || — || January 22, 2013 || Mount Lemmon || Mount Lemmon Survey ||  || align=right | 1.9 km || 
|-id=216 bgcolor=#d6d6d6
| 582216 ||  || — || March 18, 2013 || Mount Lemmon || Mount Lemmon Survey ||  || align=right | 2.0 km || 
|-id=217 bgcolor=#E9E9E9
| 582217 ||  || — || June 14, 2010 || Mount Lemmon || Mount Lemmon Survey ||  || align=right | 2.0 km || 
|-id=218 bgcolor=#d6d6d6
| 582218 ||  || — || April 28, 2014 || Kitt Peak || Spacewatch ||  || align=right | 2.4 km || 
|-id=219 bgcolor=#d6d6d6
| 582219 ||  || — || September 23, 2009 || Mount Lemmon || Mount Lemmon Survey || 7:4 || align=right | 3.3 km || 
|-id=220 bgcolor=#d6d6d6
| 582220 ||  || — || June 29, 2015 || Haleakala || Pan-STARRS ||  || align=right | 2.2 km || 
|-id=221 bgcolor=#d6d6d6
| 582221 ||  || — || October 17, 2010 || Mount Lemmon || Mount Lemmon Survey ||  || align=right | 2.2 km || 
|-id=222 bgcolor=#d6d6d6
| 582222 ||  || — || August 9, 2015 || Haleakala || Pan-STARRS ||  || align=right | 1.8 km || 
|-id=223 bgcolor=#d6d6d6
| 582223 ||  || — || August 12, 2015 || Haleakala || Pan-STARRS ||  || align=right | 1.8 km || 
|-id=224 bgcolor=#d6d6d6
| 582224 ||  || — || January 8, 2013 || Kitt Peak || Spacewatch ||  || align=right | 3.1 km || 
|-id=225 bgcolor=#d6d6d6
| 582225 ||  || — || November 4, 2005 || Anderson Mesa || LONEOS ||  || align=right | 4.0 km || 
|-id=226 bgcolor=#d6d6d6
| 582226 ||  || — || September 20, 2009 || Mount Lemmon || Mount Lemmon Survey || 7:4 || align=right | 2.3 km || 
|-id=227 bgcolor=#d6d6d6
| 582227 ||  || — || January 19, 2012 || Kitt Peak || Spacewatch ||  || align=right | 2.9 km || 
|-id=228 bgcolor=#E9E9E9
| 582228 ||  || — || July 9, 2002 || Palomar || NEAT ||  || align=right | 1.6 km || 
|-id=229 bgcolor=#d6d6d6
| 582229 ||  || — || August 21, 2015 || Haleakala || Pan-STARRS ||  || align=right | 2.2 km || 
|-id=230 bgcolor=#d6d6d6
| 582230 ||  || — || August 21, 2015 || Haleakala || Pan-STARRS ||  || align=right | 2.6 km || 
|-id=231 bgcolor=#d6d6d6
| 582231 ||  || — || July 2, 2014 || Haleakala || Pan-STARRS ||  || align=right | 2.4 km || 
|-id=232 bgcolor=#d6d6d6
| 582232 ||  || — || August 21, 2015 || Haleakala || Pan-STARRS ||  || align=right | 2.2 km || 
|-id=233 bgcolor=#d6d6d6
| 582233 ||  || — || August 30, 2015 || Haleakala || Pan-STARRS ||  || align=right | 2.6 km || 
|-id=234 bgcolor=#d6d6d6
| 582234 ||  || — || May 23, 2014 || Haleakala || Pan-STARRS ||  || align=right | 2.9 km || 
|-id=235 bgcolor=#d6d6d6
| 582235 ||  || — || December 8, 2012 || Mount Lemmon || Mount Lemmon Survey ||  || align=right | 2.9 km || 
|-id=236 bgcolor=#E9E9E9
| 582236 ||  || — || July 21, 2006 || Mount Lemmon || Mount Lemmon Survey ||  || align=right | 1.9 km || 
|-id=237 bgcolor=#d6d6d6
| 582237 ||  || — || November 30, 2011 || Mount Lemmon || Mount Lemmon Survey ||  || align=right | 3.2 km || 
|-id=238 bgcolor=#fefefe
| 582238 ||  || — || December 4, 2012 || Mount Lemmon || Mount Lemmon Survey ||  || align=right data-sort-value="0.65" | 650 m || 
|-id=239 bgcolor=#d6d6d6
| 582239 ||  || — || March 15, 2013 || Mount Lemmon || Mount Lemmon Survey || 7:4 || align=right | 3.5 km || 
|-id=240 bgcolor=#fefefe
| 582240 ||  || — || July 23, 2015 || Haleakala || Pan-STARRS ||  || align=right data-sort-value="0.58" | 580 m || 
|-id=241 bgcolor=#d6d6d6
| 582241 ||  || — || September 9, 2015 || Haleakala || Pan-STARRS ||  || align=right | 2.2 km || 
|-id=242 bgcolor=#d6d6d6
| 582242 ||  || — || December 25, 2010 || Mount Lemmon || Mount Lemmon Survey ||  || align=right | 2.8 km || 
|-id=243 bgcolor=#d6d6d6
| 582243 ||  || — || July 23, 2015 || Haleakala || Pan-STARRS ||  || align=right | 2.3 km || 
|-id=244 bgcolor=#d6d6d6
| 582244 ||  || — || October 17, 2010 || Mount Lemmon || Mount Lemmon Survey ||  || align=right | 2.6 km || 
|-id=245 bgcolor=#d6d6d6
| 582245 ||  || — || September 10, 2015 || Haleakala || Pan-STARRS ||  || align=right | 2.5 km || 
|-id=246 bgcolor=#d6d6d6
| 582246 ||  || — || September 12, 2009 || Kitt Peak || Spacewatch || 7:4 || align=right | 3.0 km || 
|-id=247 bgcolor=#d6d6d6
| 582247 ||  || — || February 13, 2012 || Haleakala || Pan-STARRS ||  || align=right | 2.5 km || 
|-id=248 bgcolor=#fefefe
| 582248 ||  || — || April 30, 2014 || Haleakala || Pan-STARRS ||  || align=right data-sort-value="0.57" | 570 m || 
|-id=249 bgcolor=#d6d6d6
| 582249 ||  || — || April 10, 2013 || Haleakala || Pan-STARRS ||  || align=right | 2.6 km || 
|-id=250 bgcolor=#d6d6d6
| 582250 ||  || — || May 2, 2008 || Catalina || CSS ||  || align=right | 2.8 km || 
|-id=251 bgcolor=#d6d6d6
| 582251 ||  || — || March 18, 2001 || Kitt Peak || Spacewatch ||  || align=right | 2.6 km || 
|-id=252 bgcolor=#d6d6d6
| 582252 ||  || — || September 10, 2015 || Haleakala || Pan-STARRS ||  || align=right | 2.4 km || 
|-id=253 bgcolor=#fefefe
| 582253 ||  || — || October 6, 2008 || Mount Lemmon || Mount Lemmon Survey ||  || align=right | 1.1 km || 
|-id=254 bgcolor=#d6d6d6
| 582254 ||  || — || December 10, 2005 || Kitt Peak || Spacewatch ||  || align=right | 4.1 km || 
|-id=255 bgcolor=#d6d6d6
| 582255 ||  || — || September 2, 2010 || Mount Lemmon || Mount Lemmon Survey ||  || align=right | 2.6 km || 
|-id=256 bgcolor=#fefefe
| 582256 ||  || — || October 16, 2012 || Mount Lemmon || Mount Lemmon Survey ||  || align=right data-sort-value="0.82" | 820 m || 
|-id=257 bgcolor=#d6d6d6
| 582257 ||  || — || October 31, 2010 || Kitt Peak || Spacewatch ||  || align=right | 4.1 km || 
|-id=258 bgcolor=#fefefe
| 582258 ||  || — || August 25, 2005 || Palomar || NEAT ||  || align=right data-sort-value="0.66" | 660 m || 
|-id=259 bgcolor=#fefefe
| 582259 ||  || — || September 9, 2015 || Haleakala || Pan-STARRS ||  || align=right data-sort-value="0.59" | 590 m || 
|-id=260 bgcolor=#fefefe
| 582260 ||  || — || January 8, 2010 || Kitt Peak || Spacewatch ||  || align=right data-sort-value="0.82" | 820 m || 
|-id=261 bgcolor=#fefefe
| 582261 ||  || — || October 1, 2005 || Anderson Mesa || LONEOS ||  || align=right data-sort-value="0.76" | 760 m || 
|-id=262 bgcolor=#E9E9E9
| 582262 ||  || — || March 1, 2009 || Kitt Peak || Spacewatch ||  || align=right | 1.4 km || 
|-id=263 bgcolor=#d6d6d6
| 582263 ||  || — || March 29, 2008 || Mount Lemmon || Mount Lemmon Survey ||  || align=right | 1.9 km || 
|-id=264 bgcolor=#d6d6d6
| 582264 ||  || — || March 20, 2002 || Kitt Peak || Spacewatch ||  || align=right | 2.5 km || 
|-id=265 bgcolor=#d6d6d6
| 582265 ||  || — || September 29, 2010 || Mount Lemmon || Mount Lemmon Survey ||  || align=right | 2.0 km || 
|-id=266 bgcolor=#fefefe
| 582266 ||  || — || February 26, 2014 || Haleakala || Pan-STARRS ||  || align=right data-sort-value="0.46" | 460 m || 
|-id=267 bgcolor=#d6d6d6
| 582267 ||  || — || May 28, 2014 || Haleakala || Pan-STARRS ||  || align=right | 2.1 km || 
|-id=268 bgcolor=#d6d6d6
| 582268 ||  || — || February 23, 2007 || Mount Lemmon || Mount Lemmon Survey ||  || align=right | 2.4 km || 
|-id=269 bgcolor=#d6d6d6
| 582269 ||  || — || September 17, 2010 || Mount Lemmon || Mount Lemmon Survey ||  || align=right | 1.8 km || 
|-id=270 bgcolor=#d6d6d6
| 582270 ||  || — || March 14, 2013 || Kitt Peak || Spacewatch ||  || align=right | 2.2 km || 
|-id=271 bgcolor=#fefefe
| 582271 ||  || — || January 26, 2007 || Kitt Peak || Spacewatch ||  || align=right data-sort-value="0.58" | 580 m || 
|-id=272 bgcolor=#fefefe
| 582272 ||  || — || October 25, 2005 || Kitt Peak || Spacewatch ||  || align=right data-sort-value="0.68" | 680 m || 
|-id=273 bgcolor=#fefefe
| 582273 ||  || — || October 18, 2012 || Haleakala || Pan-STARRS ||  || align=right data-sort-value="0.43" | 430 m || 
|-id=274 bgcolor=#fefefe
| 582274 ||  || — || October 22, 2012 || Haleakala || Pan-STARRS ||  || align=right data-sort-value="0.70" | 700 m || 
|-id=275 bgcolor=#fefefe
| 582275 ||  || — || March 27, 2011 || Mount Lemmon || Mount Lemmon Survey ||  || align=right data-sort-value="0.50" | 500 m || 
|-id=276 bgcolor=#d6d6d6
| 582276 ||  || — || August 27, 2009 || Kitt Peak || Spacewatch ||  || align=right | 2.3 km || 
|-id=277 bgcolor=#d6d6d6
| 582277 ||  || — || August 12, 2015 || Haleakala || Pan-STARRS ||  || align=right | 2.2 km || 
|-id=278 bgcolor=#fefefe
| 582278 ||  || — || March 18, 2004 || Kitt Peak || Spacewatch ||  || align=right data-sort-value="0.47" | 470 m || 
|-id=279 bgcolor=#d6d6d6
| 582279 ||  || — || August 15, 2009 || Kitt Peak || Spacewatch ||  || align=right | 2.5 km || 
|-id=280 bgcolor=#fefefe
| 582280 ||  || — || November 25, 2009 || Kitt Peak || Spacewatch ||  || align=right data-sort-value="0.43" | 430 m || 
|-id=281 bgcolor=#d6d6d6
| 582281 ||  || — || February 23, 2012 || Mount Lemmon || Mount Lemmon Survey || 7:4 || align=right | 2.8 km || 
|-id=282 bgcolor=#fefefe
| 582282 ||  || — || September 18, 2001 || Apache Point || SDSS Collaboration ||  || align=right data-sort-value="0.83" | 830 m || 
|-id=283 bgcolor=#d6d6d6
| 582283 ||  || — || September 11, 2015 || Haleakala || Pan-STARRS ||  || align=right | 2.2 km || 
|-id=284 bgcolor=#d6d6d6
| 582284 ||  || — || July 25, 2015 || Haleakala || Pan-STARRS ||  || align=right | 2.5 km || 
|-id=285 bgcolor=#d6d6d6
| 582285 ||  || — || March 28, 2008 || Mount Lemmon || Mount Lemmon Survey ||  || align=right | 2.5 km || 
|-id=286 bgcolor=#d6d6d6
| 582286 ||  || — || March 17, 2012 || Mount Lemmon || Mount Lemmon Survey ||  || align=right | 2.7 km || 
|-id=287 bgcolor=#fefefe
| 582287 ||  || — || September 13, 2007 || Kitt Peak || Spacewatch ||  || align=right data-sort-value="0.69" | 690 m || 
|-id=288 bgcolor=#d6d6d6
| 582288 ||  || — || September 8, 2015 || Haleakala || Pan-STARRS ||  || align=right | 3.4 km || 
|-id=289 bgcolor=#d6d6d6
| 582289 ||  || — || December 31, 2005 || Kitt Peak || Spacewatch ||  || align=right | 2.7 km || 
|-id=290 bgcolor=#fefefe
| 582290 ||  || — || October 3, 2011 || Mount Lemmon || Mount Lemmon Survey ||  || align=right | 1.1 km || 
|-id=291 bgcolor=#d6d6d6
| 582291 ||  || — || May 5, 2008 || Mount Lemmon || Mount Lemmon Survey ||  || align=right | 2.8 km || 
|-id=292 bgcolor=#d6d6d6
| 582292 ||  || — || November 8, 2010 || Kitt Peak || Spacewatch ||  || align=right | 2.3 km || 
|-id=293 bgcolor=#d6d6d6
| 582293 ||  || — || September 9, 2015 || Haleakala || Pan-STARRS || 7:4 || align=right | 3.6 km || 
|-id=294 bgcolor=#d6d6d6
| 582294 ||  || — || October 29, 2010 || Mount Lemmon || Mount Lemmon Survey ||  || align=right | 3.3 km || 
|-id=295 bgcolor=#d6d6d6
| 582295 ||  || — || April 16, 2013 || Cerro Tololo-DECam || CTIO-DECam ||  || align=right | 1.9 km || 
|-id=296 bgcolor=#fefefe
| 582296 ||  || — || September 9, 2015 || Haleakala || Pan-STARRS || H || align=right data-sort-value="0.62" | 620 m || 
|-id=297 bgcolor=#d6d6d6
| 582297 ||  || — || September 9, 2015 || Haleakala || Pan-STARRS ||  || align=right | 3.2 km || 
|-id=298 bgcolor=#d6d6d6
| 582298 ||  || — || September 6, 2015 || Haleakala || Pan-STARRS ||  || align=right | 2.8 km || 
|-id=299 bgcolor=#d6d6d6
| 582299 ||  || — || September 9, 2015 || Haleakala || Pan-STARRS ||  || align=right | 2.1 km || 
|-id=300 bgcolor=#d6d6d6
| 582300 ||  || — || September 12, 2015 || Haleakala || Pan-STARRS ||  || align=right | 2.1 km || 
|}

582301–582400 

|-bgcolor=#C2E0FF
| 582301 ||  || — || September 9, 2015 || Haleakala || Pan-STARRS || centaurdamocloidcritical || align=right | 27 km || 
|-id=302 bgcolor=#d6d6d6
| 582302 ||  || — || July 28, 2014 || Haleakala || Pan-STARRS ||  || align=right | 2.3 km || 
|-id=303 bgcolor=#d6d6d6
| 582303 ||  || — || September 11, 2015 || Haleakala || Pan-STARRS ||  || align=right | 2.2 km || 
|-id=304 bgcolor=#d6d6d6
| 582304 ||  || — || September 12, 2015 || Haleakala || Pan-STARRS ||  || align=right | 2.5 km || 
|-id=305 bgcolor=#fefefe
| 582305 ||  || — || September 6, 2015 || Haleakala || Pan-STARRS || H || align=right data-sort-value="0.65" | 650 m || 
|-id=306 bgcolor=#d6d6d6
| 582306 ||  || — || September 12, 2015 || Haleakala || Pan-STARRS ||  || align=right | 2.4 km || 
|-id=307 bgcolor=#fefefe
| 582307 ||  || — || November 18, 2009 || Mount Lemmon || Mount Lemmon Survey ||  || align=right data-sort-value="0.87" | 870 m || 
|-id=308 bgcolor=#d6d6d6
| 582308 ||  || — || June 19, 2014 || Haleakala || Pan-STARRS ||  || align=right | 2.6 km || 
|-id=309 bgcolor=#E9E9E9
| 582309 ||  || — || November 21, 2007 || Mount Lemmon || Mount Lemmon Survey ||  || align=right | 2.0 km || 
|-id=310 bgcolor=#d6d6d6
| 582310 ||  || — || September 11, 2015 || Haleakala || Pan-STARRS ||  || align=right | 2.1 km || 
|-id=311 bgcolor=#d6d6d6
| 582311 ||  || — || July 23, 2015 || Haleakala || Pan-STARRS ||  || align=right | 2.7 km || 
|-id=312 bgcolor=#d6d6d6
| 582312 ||  || — || September 30, 2010 || Mount Lemmon || Mount Lemmon Survey ||  || align=right | 2.4 km || 
|-id=313 bgcolor=#d6d6d6
| 582313 ||  || — || October 3, 2005 || Kitt Peak || Spacewatch ||  || align=right | 2.1 km || 
|-id=314 bgcolor=#fefefe
| 582314 ||  || — || September 19, 2012 || Mount Lemmon || Mount Lemmon Survey ||  || align=right data-sort-value="0.46" | 460 m || 
|-id=315 bgcolor=#fefefe
| 582315 ||  || — || October 22, 2012 || Mount Lemmon || Mount Lemmon Survey ||  || align=right data-sort-value="0.56" | 560 m || 
|-id=316 bgcolor=#E9E9E9
| 582316 ||  || — || September 23, 2015 || Haleakala || Pan-STARRS ||  || align=right | 1.4 km || 
|-id=317 bgcolor=#d6d6d6
| 582317 ||  || — || February 3, 2012 || Haleakala || Pan-STARRS ||  || align=right | 2.9 km || 
|-id=318 bgcolor=#fefefe
| 582318 ||  || — || September 23, 2015 || Haleakala || Pan-STARRS ||  || align=right data-sort-value="0.67" | 670 m || 
|-id=319 bgcolor=#fefefe
| 582319 ||  || — || September 19, 2011 || Haleakala || Pan-STARRS ||  || align=right data-sort-value="0.89" | 890 m || 
|-id=320 bgcolor=#fefefe
| 582320 ||  || — || September 4, 2011 || Haleakala || Pan-STARRS ||  || align=right data-sort-value="0.71" | 710 m || 
|-id=321 bgcolor=#fefefe
| 582321 ||  || — || September 23, 2015 || Haleakala || Pan-STARRS ||  || align=right data-sort-value="0.73" | 730 m || 
|-id=322 bgcolor=#fefefe
| 582322 ||  || — || September 23, 2015 || Haleakala || Pan-STARRS ||  || align=right data-sort-value="0.65" | 650 m || 
|-id=323 bgcolor=#d6d6d6
| 582323 ||  || — || September 23, 2015 || Mount Lemmon || Mount Lemmon Survey ||  || align=right | 1.9 km || 
|-id=324 bgcolor=#d6d6d6
| 582324 ||  || — || September 23, 2015 || Haleakala || Pan-STARRS ||  || align=right | 2.4 km || 
|-id=325 bgcolor=#fefefe
| 582325 ||  || — || September 23, 2015 || Haleakala || Pan-STARRS ||  || align=right data-sort-value="0.60" | 600 m || 
|-id=326 bgcolor=#d6d6d6
| 582326 ||  || — || October 1, 2015 || Mount Lemmon || Mount Lemmon Survey ||  || align=right | 2.6 km || 
|-id=327 bgcolor=#E9E9E9
| 582327 ||  || — || September 14, 2006 || Catalina || CSS ||  || align=right | 1.6 km || 
|-id=328 bgcolor=#d6d6d6
| 582328 ||  || — || June 29, 2015 || Haleakala || Pan-STARRS ||  || align=right | 2.7 km || 
|-id=329 bgcolor=#d6d6d6
| 582329 ||  || — || July 25, 2015 || Haleakala || Pan-STARRS ||  || align=right | 2.7 km || 
|-id=330 bgcolor=#d6d6d6
| 582330 ||  || — || October 11, 2010 || Kitt Peak || Spacewatch ||  || align=right | 2.2 km || 
|-id=331 bgcolor=#d6d6d6
| 582331 ||  || — || July 29, 2009 || Kitt Peak || Spacewatch ||  || align=right | 3.5 km || 
|-id=332 bgcolor=#fefefe
| 582332 ||  || — || December 17, 2009 || Mount Lemmon || Mount Lemmon Survey ||  || align=right data-sort-value="0.98" | 980 m || 
|-id=333 bgcolor=#fefefe
| 582333 ||  || — || February 6, 2013 || Kitt Peak || Spacewatch ||  || align=right data-sort-value="0.64" | 640 m || 
|-id=334 bgcolor=#fefefe
| 582334 ||  || — || November 21, 2009 || Mount Lemmon || Mount Lemmon Survey ||  || align=right data-sort-value="0.71" | 710 m || 
|-id=335 bgcolor=#fefefe
| 582335 ||  || — || September 6, 2015 || Haleakala || Pan-STARRS ||  || align=right data-sort-value="0.67" | 670 m || 
|-id=336 bgcolor=#fefefe
| 582336 ||  || — || September 14, 2002 || Palomar || NEAT ||  || align=right data-sort-value="0.68" | 680 m || 
|-id=337 bgcolor=#d6d6d6
| 582337 ||  || — || May 6, 2014 || Haleakala || Pan-STARRS ||  || align=right | 2.1 km || 
|-id=338 bgcolor=#d6d6d6
| 582338 ||  || — || April 13, 2008 || Mount Lemmon || Mount Lemmon Survey ||  || align=right | 3.4 km || 
|-id=339 bgcolor=#d6d6d6
| 582339 ||  || — || May 30, 2015 || Haleakala || Pan-STARRS ||  || align=right | 2.4 km || 
|-id=340 bgcolor=#d6d6d6
| 582340 ||  || — || February 25, 2012 || Mayhill-ISON || L. Elenin || 7:4 || align=right | 4.1 km || 
|-id=341 bgcolor=#d6d6d6
| 582341 ||  || — || March 13, 2013 || Palomar || PTF ||  || align=right | 2.5 km || 
|-id=342 bgcolor=#d6d6d6
| 582342 ||  || — || April 8, 2002 || Kitt Peak || Spacewatch ||  || align=right | 2.3 km || 
|-id=343 bgcolor=#fefefe
| 582343 ||  || — || October 22, 2012 || Mount Lemmon || Mount Lemmon Survey ||  || align=right data-sort-value="0.47" | 470 m || 
|-id=344 bgcolor=#d6d6d6
| 582344 ||  || — || July 25, 2015 || Haleakala || Pan-STARRS ||  || align=right | 2.1 km || 
|-id=345 bgcolor=#E9E9E9
| 582345 ||  || — || March 16, 2004 || Kitt Peak || Spacewatch ||  || align=right | 1.5 km || 
|-id=346 bgcolor=#d6d6d6
| 582346 ||  || — || January 19, 2012 || Kitt Peak || Spacewatch ||  || align=right | 3.4 km || 
|-id=347 bgcolor=#d6d6d6
| 582347 ||  || — || October 14, 2010 || Mount Lemmon || Mount Lemmon Survey ||  || align=right | 2.6 km || 
|-id=348 bgcolor=#fefefe
| 582348 ||  || — || April 18, 2007 || Kitt Peak || Spacewatch ||  || align=right data-sort-value="0.75" | 750 m || 
|-id=349 bgcolor=#d6d6d6
| 582349 ||  || — || September 18, 2010 || Mount Lemmon || Mount Lemmon Survey ||  || align=right | 2.9 km || 
|-id=350 bgcolor=#d6d6d6
| 582350 ||  || — || April 1, 2008 || Mount Lemmon || Mount Lemmon Survey ||  || align=right | 3.1 km || 
|-id=351 bgcolor=#fefefe
| 582351 ||  || — || December 21, 2008 || Kitt Peak || Spacewatch ||  || align=right data-sort-value="0.68" | 680 m || 
|-id=352 bgcolor=#fefefe
| 582352 ||  || — || May 8, 2014 || Haleakala || Pan-STARRS ||  || align=right data-sort-value="0.52" | 520 m || 
|-id=353 bgcolor=#fefefe
| 582353 ||  || — || August 4, 2005 || Palomar || NEAT ||  || align=right data-sort-value="0.55" | 550 m || 
|-id=354 bgcolor=#E9E9E9
| 582354 ||  || — || November 1, 2006 || Mount Lemmon || Mount Lemmon Survey ||  || align=right | 2.2 km || 
|-id=355 bgcolor=#fefefe
| 582355 ||  || — || September 25, 2008 || Mount Lemmon || Mount Lemmon Survey ||  || align=right data-sort-value="0.58" | 580 m || 
|-id=356 bgcolor=#E9E9E9
| 582356 ||  || — || October 3, 2006 || Mount Lemmon || Mount Lemmon Survey ||  || align=right | 1.7 km || 
|-id=357 bgcolor=#d6d6d6
| 582357 ||  || — || September 29, 2009 || Kitt Peak || Spacewatch ||  || align=right | 2.8 km || 
|-id=358 bgcolor=#fefefe
| 582358 ||  || — || September 9, 2015 || Haleakala || Pan-STARRS ||  || align=right data-sort-value="0.69" | 690 m || 
|-id=359 bgcolor=#fefefe
| 582359 ||  || — || December 10, 2012 || Kitt Peak || Spacewatch ||  || align=right data-sort-value="0.70" | 700 m || 
|-id=360 bgcolor=#fefefe
| 582360 ||  || — || March 28, 2014 || Haleakala || Pan-STARRS ||  || align=right data-sort-value="0.75" | 750 m || 
|-id=361 bgcolor=#fefefe
| 582361 ||  || — || September 20, 2008 || Kitt Peak || Spacewatch ||  || align=right data-sort-value="0.62" | 620 m || 
|-id=362 bgcolor=#fefefe
| 582362 ||  || — || May 4, 2014 || Mount Lemmon || Mount Lemmon Survey || H || align=right data-sort-value="0.57" | 570 m || 
|-id=363 bgcolor=#fefefe
| 582363 ||  || — || June 2, 2011 || Haleakala || Pan-STARRS ||  || align=right data-sort-value="0.53" | 530 m || 
|-id=364 bgcolor=#fefefe
| 582364 ||  || — || October 8, 2008 || Mount Lemmon || Mount Lemmon Survey ||  || align=right data-sort-value="0.63" | 630 m || 
|-id=365 bgcolor=#fefefe
| 582365 ||  || — || November 30, 2008 || Kitt Peak || Spacewatch ||  || align=right data-sort-value="0.89" | 890 m || 
|-id=366 bgcolor=#fefefe
| 582366 ||  || — || October 8, 2015 || Haleakala || Pan-STARRS ||  || align=right data-sort-value="0.85" | 850 m || 
|-id=367 bgcolor=#d6d6d6
| 582367 ||  || — || June 8, 2014 || Haleakala || Pan-STARRS ||  || align=right | 2.4 km || 
|-id=368 bgcolor=#fefefe
| 582368 ||  || — || September 4, 2011 || Haleakala || Pan-STARRS ||  || align=right data-sort-value="0.55" | 550 m || 
|-id=369 bgcolor=#fefefe
| 582369 ||  || — || September 18, 2011 || Mount Lemmon || Mount Lemmon Survey ||  || align=right data-sort-value="0.70" | 700 m || 
|-id=370 bgcolor=#C2FFFF
| 582370 ||  || — || November 21, 2014 || Haleakala || Pan-STARRS || L5 || align=right | 6.2 km || 
|-id=371 bgcolor=#fefefe
| 582371 ||  || — || October 8, 2015 || Haleakala || Pan-STARRS ||  || align=right data-sort-value="0.98" | 980 m || 
|-id=372 bgcolor=#E9E9E9
| 582372 ||  || — || September 12, 2015 || Haleakala || Pan-STARRS ||  || align=right | 1.8 km || 
|-id=373 bgcolor=#d6d6d6
| 582373 ||  || — || March 17, 2013 || Mount Lemmon || Mount Lemmon Survey || KOR || align=right | 1.0 km || 
|-id=374 bgcolor=#d6d6d6
| 582374 ||  || — || March 26, 2008 || Mount Lemmon || Mount Lemmon Survey ||  || align=right | 2.6 km || 
|-id=375 bgcolor=#E9E9E9
| 582375 ||  || — || June 29, 2015 || Haleakala || Pan-STARRS ||  || align=right | 1.7 km || 
|-id=376 bgcolor=#fefefe
| 582376 ||  || — || May 11, 2010 || Mount Lemmon || Mount Lemmon Survey ||  || align=right data-sort-value="0.90" | 900 m || 
|-id=377 bgcolor=#d6d6d6
| 582377 ||  || — || November 17, 2011 || Kitt Peak || Spacewatch ||  || align=right | 2.9 km || 
|-id=378 bgcolor=#d6d6d6
| 582378 ||  || — || February 14, 2013 || Kitt Peak || Spacewatch ||  || align=right | 2.8 km || 
|-id=379 bgcolor=#d6d6d6
| 582379 ||  || — || August 28, 2015 || Haleakala || Pan-STARRS ||  || align=right | 2.4 km || 
|-id=380 bgcolor=#d6d6d6
| 582380 ||  || — || December 25, 2010 || Mount Lemmon || Mount Lemmon Survey ||  || align=right | 3.1 km || 
|-id=381 bgcolor=#fefefe
| 582381 ||  || — || November 22, 2008 || Kitt Peak || Spacewatch ||  || align=right data-sort-value="0.85" | 850 m || 
|-id=382 bgcolor=#d6d6d6
| 582382 ||  || — || October 9, 2004 || Kitt Peak || Spacewatch || EOS || align=right | 1.8 km || 
|-id=383 bgcolor=#d6d6d6
| 582383 ||  || — || July 25, 2015 || Haleakala || Pan-STARRS ||  || align=right | 3.1 km || 
|-id=384 bgcolor=#FA8072
| 582384 ||  || — || October 28, 2011 || Mount Lemmon || Mount Lemmon Survey ||  || align=right | 1.3 km || 
|-id=385 bgcolor=#fefefe
| 582385 ||  || — || November 26, 2005 || Mount Lemmon || Mount Lemmon Survey ||  || align=right data-sort-value="0.70" | 700 m || 
|-id=386 bgcolor=#fefefe
| 582386 ||  || — || November 22, 2009 || Kitt Peak || Spacewatch ||  || align=right data-sort-value="0.61" | 610 m || 
|-id=387 bgcolor=#fefefe
| 582387 ||  || — || January 26, 2007 || Kitt Peak || Spacewatch ||  || align=right data-sort-value="0.64" | 640 m || 
|-id=388 bgcolor=#fefefe
| 582388 ||  || — || September 25, 2012 || Mount Lemmon || Mount Lemmon Survey ||  || align=right data-sort-value="0.59" | 590 m || 
|-id=389 bgcolor=#fefefe
| 582389 ||  || — || September 30, 2005 || Mount Lemmon || Mount Lemmon Survey ||  || align=right data-sort-value="0.49" | 490 m || 
|-id=390 bgcolor=#fefefe
| 582390 ||  || — || September 20, 2008 || Mount Lemmon || Mount Lemmon Survey ||  || align=right data-sort-value="0.68" | 680 m || 
|-id=391 bgcolor=#fefefe
| 582391 ||  || — || April 19, 2007 || Kitt Peak || Spacewatch ||  || align=right data-sort-value="0.65" | 650 m || 
|-id=392 bgcolor=#fefefe
| 582392 ||  || — || February 26, 2007 || Mount Lemmon || Mount Lemmon Survey ||  || align=right data-sort-value="0.52" | 520 m || 
|-id=393 bgcolor=#E9E9E9
| 582393 ||  || — || September 28, 2011 || Mount Lemmon || Mount Lemmon Survey ||  || align=right data-sort-value="0.78" | 780 m || 
|-id=394 bgcolor=#FA8072
| 582394 ||  || — || March 6, 2002 || Siding Spring || R. H. McNaught ||  || align=right data-sort-value="0.52" | 520 m || 
|-id=395 bgcolor=#fefefe
| 582395 ||  || — || August 30, 2011 || Haleakala || Pan-STARRS ||  || align=right data-sort-value="0.70" | 700 m || 
|-id=396 bgcolor=#fefefe
| 582396 ||  || — || May 1, 1994 || Kitt Peak || Spacewatch ||  || align=right data-sort-value="0.64" | 640 m || 
|-id=397 bgcolor=#d6d6d6
| 582397 ||  || — || December 25, 2010 || Mount Lemmon || Mount Lemmon Survey ||  || align=right | 2.5 km || 
|-id=398 bgcolor=#E9E9E9
| 582398 ||  || — || September 12, 2002 || Palomar || NEAT ||  || align=right | 1.5 km || 
|-id=399 bgcolor=#fefefe
| 582399 ||  || — || October 11, 2015 || Space Surveillance || Space Surveillance Telescope || H || align=right data-sort-value="0.59" | 590 m || 
|-id=400 bgcolor=#d6d6d6
| 582400 ||  || — || September 6, 2015 || Haleakala || Pan-STARRS ||  || align=right | 2.3 km || 
|}

582401–582500 

|-bgcolor=#d6d6d6
| 582401 ||  || — || October 12, 2015 || Haleakala || Pan-STARRS ||  || align=right | 2.2 km || 
|-id=402 bgcolor=#d6d6d6
| 582402 ||  || — || October 2, 2009 || Mount Lemmon || Mount Lemmon Survey || 7:4 || align=right | 4.0 km || 
|-id=403 bgcolor=#fefefe
| 582403 ||  || — || April 30, 2014 || Haleakala || Pan-STARRS ||  || align=right data-sort-value="0.68" | 680 m || 
|-id=404 bgcolor=#d6d6d6
| 582404 ||  || — || September 29, 2009 || Mount Lemmon || Mount Lemmon Survey || 7:4 || align=right | 3.1 km || 
|-id=405 bgcolor=#d6d6d6
| 582405 ||  || — || November 6, 2010 || Mount Lemmon || Mount Lemmon Survey ||  || align=right | 2.4 km || 
|-id=406 bgcolor=#d6d6d6
| 582406 ||  || — || October 2, 2015 || Mount Lemmon || Mount Lemmon Survey ||  || align=right | 2.4 km || 
|-id=407 bgcolor=#fefefe
| 582407 ||  || — || October 26, 2008 || Mount Lemmon || Mount Lemmon Survey ||  || align=right data-sort-value="0.57" | 570 m || 
|-id=408 bgcolor=#fefefe
| 582408 ||  || — || March 29, 2014 || Mount Lemmon || Mount Lemmon Survey ||  || align=right data-sort-value="0.45" | 450 m || 
|-id=409 bgcolor=#fefefe
| 582409 ||  || — || October 9, 2015 || XuYi || PMO NEO ||  || align=right data-sort-value="0.78" | 780 m || 
|-id=410 bgcolor=#d6d6d6
| 582410 ||  || — || April 10, 2013 || Haleakala || Pan-STARRS ||  || align=right | 2.2 km || 
|-id=411 bgcolor=#E9E9E9
| 582411 ||  || — || November 1, 2011 || Mount Lemmon || Mount Lemmon Survey ||  || align=right | 2.1 km || 
|-id=412 bgcolor=#fefefe
| 582412 ||  || — || July 25, 2015 || Haleakala || Pan-STARRS ||  || align=right data-sort-value="0.68" | 680 m || 
|-id=413 bgcolor=#E9E9E9
| 582413 ||  || — || April 5, 2014 || Haleakala || Pan-STARRS ||  || align=right | 1.6 km || 
|-id=414 bgcolor=#d6d6d6
| 582414 ||  || — || May 24, 2014 || Mount Lemmon || Mount Lemmon Survey ||  || align=right | 2.1 km || 
|-id=415 bgcolor=#fefefe
| 582415 ||  || — || October 2, 2015 || Mount Lemmon || Mount Lemmon Survey ||  || align=right data-sort-value="0.51" | 510 m || 
|-id=416 bgcolor=#fefefe
| 582416 ||  || — || March 13, 2011 || Mount Lemmon || Mount Lemmon Survey ||  || align=right data-sort-value="0.46" | 460 m || 
|-id=417 bgcolor=#d6d6d6
| 582417 ||  || — || December 3, 2010 || Kitt Peak || Spacewatch ||  || align=right | 3.1 km || 
|-id=418 bgcolor=#d6d6d6
| 582418 ||  || — || April 13, 2013 || Haleakala || Pan-STARRS ||  || align=right | 2.6 km || 
|-id=419 bgcolor=#d6d6d6
| 582419 ||  || — || May 6, 2014 || Haleakala || Pan-STARRS ||  || align=right | 2.1 km || 
|-id=420 bgcolor=#d6d6d6
| 582420 ||  || — || September 11, 2015 || Haleakala || Pan-STARRS ||  || align=right | 2.3 km || 
|-id=421 bgcolor=#fefefe
| 582421 ||  || — || June 6, 2011 || Haleakala || Pan-STARRS ||  || align=right data-sort-value="0.63" | 630 m || 
|-id=422 bgcolor=#fefefe
| 582422 ||  || — || April 23, 2014 || Mount Lemmon || Mount Lemmon Survey ||  || align=right data-sort-value="0.57" | 570 m || 
|-id=423 bgcolor=#fefefe
| 582423 ||  || — || December 2, 2008 || Mount Lemmon || Mount Lemmon Survey ||  || align=right | 1.0 km || 
|-id=424 bgcolor=#d6d6d6
| 582424 ||  || — || August 21, 2015 || Haleakala || Pan-STARRS ||  || align=right | 2.5 km || 
|-id=425 bgcolor=#d6d6d6
| 582425 ||  || — || February 1, 2012 || Mount Lemmon || Mount Lemmon Survey ||  || align=right | 2.6 km || 
|-id=426 bgcolor=#d6d6d6
| 582426 ||  || — || June 28, 2014 || Haleakala || Pan-STARRS ||  || align=right | 2.1 km || 
|-id=427 bgcolor=#d6d6d6
| 582427 ||  || — || August 21, 2015 || Haleakala || Pan-STARRS ||  || align=right | 2.1 km || 
|-id=428 bgcolor=#d6d6d6
| 582428 ||  || — || August 21, 2015 || Haleakala || Pan-STARRS ||  || align=right | 2.1 km || 
|-id=429 bgcolor=#d6d6d6
| 582429 ||  || — || February 8, 2013 || Kitt Peak || Spacewatch ||  || align=right | 2.8 km || 
|-id=430 bgcolor=#E9E9E9
| 582430 ||  || — || May 9, 2014 || Mount Lemmon || Mount Lemmon Survey ||  || align=right | 1.6 km || 
|-id=431 bgcolor=#E9E9E9
| 582431 ||  || — || October 2, 2006 || Mount Lemmon || Mount Lemmon Survey ||  || align=right | 1.8 km || 
|-id=432 bgcolor=#d6d6d6
| 582432 ||  || — || October 11, 2015 || Oukaimeden || C. Rinner ||  || align=right | 2.5 km || 
|-id=433 bgcolor=#fefefe
| 582433 ||  || — || October 8, 2015 || Haleakala || Pan-STARRS || H || align=right data-sort-value="0.71" | 710 m || 
|-id=434 bgcolor=#fefefe
| 582434 ||  || — || March 13, 2007 || Mount Lemmon || Mount Lemmon Survey ||  || align=right data-sort-value="0.90" | 900 m || 
|-id=435 bgcolor=#d6d6d6
| 582435 ||  || — || October 11, 2015 || XuYi || PMO NEO ||  || align=right | 2.7 km || 
|-id=436 bgcolor=#fefefe
| 582436 ||  || — || April 14, 2010 || Mount Lemmon || Mount Lemmon Survey ||  || align=right data-sort-value="0.75" | 750 m || 
|-id=437 bgcolor=#d6d6d6
| 582437 ||  || — || October 12, 2015 || Haleakala || Pan-STARRS ||  || align=right | 2.1 km || 
|-id=438 bgcolor=#fefefe
| 582438 ||  || — || November 25, 2005 || Mount Lemmon || Mount Lemmon Survey ||  || align=right data-sort-value="0.57" | 570 m || 
|-id=439 bgcolor=#fefefe
| 582439 ||  || — || May 23, 2014 || Haleakala || Pan-STARRS ||  || align=right data-sort-value="0.52" | 520 m || 
|-id=440 bgcolor=#d6d6d6
| 582440 ||  || — || September 30, 2010 || Mount Lemmon || Mount Lemmon Survey ||  || align=right | 1.9 km || 
|-id=441 bgcolor=#fefefe
| 582441 ||  || — || December 8, 2005 || Kitt Peak || Spacewatch || H || align=right data-sort-value="0.52" | 520 m || 
|-id=442 bgcolor=#d6d6d6
| 582442 ||  || — || October 3, 2015 || Mount Lemmon || Mount Lemmon Survey ||  || align=right | 2.4 km || 
|-id=443 bgcolor=#d6d6d6
| 582443 ||  || — || October 15, 2015 || Haleakala || Pan-STARRS ||  || align=right | 2.2 km || 
|-id=444 bgcolor=#d6d6d6
| 582444 ||  || — || October 10, 2015 || Haleakala || Pan-STARRS ||  || align=right | 2.1 km || 
|-id=445 bgcolor=#fefefe
| 582445 ||  || — || October 10, 2015 || Haleakala || Pan-STARRS ||  || align=right data-sort-value="0.49" | 490 m || 
|-id=446 bgcolor=#d6d6d6
| 582446 ||  || — || October 11, 2015 || Mount Lemmon || Mount Lemmon Survey ||  || align=right | 2.5 km || 
|-id=447 bgcolor=#C2FFFF
| 582447 ||  || — || October 8, 2015 || Haleakala || Pan-STARRS || L5 || align=right | 6.3 km || 
|-id=448 bgcolor=#d6d6d6
| 582448 ||  || — || October 1, 2015 || Mount Lemmon || Mount Lemmon Survey ||  || align=right | 2.1 km || 
|-id=449 bgcolor=#fefefe
| 582449 ||  || — || October 10, 2015 || Haleakala || Pan-STARRS ||  || align=right data-sort-value="0.68" | 680 m || 
|-id=450 bgcolor=#fefefe
| 582450 ||  || — || August 21, 2015 || Haleakala || Pan-STARRS ||  || align=right data-sort-value="0.60" | 600 m || 
|-id=451 bgcolor=#fefefe
| 582451 ||  || — || January 28, 2007 || Kitt Peak || Spacewatch ||  || align=right data-sort-value="0.54" | 540 m || 
|-id=452 bgcolor=#E9E9E9
| 582452 ||  || — || September 20, 2011 || Kitt Peak || Spacewatch ||  || align=right | 1.2 km || 
|-id=453 bgcolor=#d6d6d6
| 582453 ||  || — || November 15, 2010 || Mount Lemmon || Mount Lemmon Survey ||  || align=right | 2.9 km || 
|-id=454 bgcolor=#d6d6d6
| 582454 ||  || — || October 10, 2007 || Catalina || CSS || 3:2 || align=right | 3.7 km || 
|-id=455 bgcolor=#d6d6d6
| 582455 ||  || — || September 12, 2015 || Haleakala || Pan-STARRS ||  || align=right | 2.0 km || 
|-id=456 bgcolor=#d6d6d6
| 582456 ||  || — || November 5, 2004 || Palomar || NEAT ||  || align=right | 2.9 km || 
|-id=457 bgcolor=#fefefe
| 582457 ||  || — || October 22, 2012 || Haleakala || Pan-STARRS ||  || align=right data-sort-value="0.66" | 660 m || 
|-id=458 bgcolor=#d6d6d6
| 582458 ||  || — || September 12, 2015 || Haleakala || Pan-STARRS ||  || align=right | 2.3 km || 
|-id=459 bgcolor=#fefefe
| 582459 ||  || — || August 30, 2005 || Kitt Peak || Spacewatch ||  || align=right data-sort-value="0.53" | 530 m || 
|-id=460 bgcolor=#fefefe
| 582460 ||  || — || April 28, 2011 || Mount Lemmon || Mount Lemmon Survey ||  || align=right data-sort-value="0.47" | 470 m || 
|-id=461 bgcolor=#fefefe
| 582461 ||  || — || December 18, 2009 || Mount Lemmon || Mount Lemmon Survey ||  || align=right data-sort-value="0.48" | 480 m || 
|-id=462 bgcolor=#d6d6d6
| 582462 ||  || — || May 31, 2014 || Haleakala || Pan-STARRS ||  || align=right | 2.5 km || 
|-id=463 bgcolor=#d6d6d6
| 582463 ||  || — || October 18, 2015 || Haleakala || Pan-STARRS ||  || align=right | 2.5 km || 
|-id=464 bgcolor=#d6d6d6
| 582464 ||  || — || May 23, 2014 || Haleakala || Pan-STARRS ||  || align=right | 1.7 km || 
|-id=465 bgcolor=#d6d6d6
| 582465 ||  || — || September 17, 2004 || Kitt Peak || Spacewatch ||  || align=right | 3.3 km || 
|-id=466 bgcolor=#fefefe
| 582466 ||  || — || September 9, 2015 || Haleakala || Pan-STARRS ||  || align=right data-sort-value="0.75" | 750 m || 
|-id=467 bgcolor=#E9E9E9
| 582467 ||  || — || September 12, 2015 || Haleakala || Pan-STARRS ||  || align=right | 2.2 km || 
|-id=468 bgcolor=#d6d6d6
| 582468 ||  || — || October 10, 2015 || Haleakala || Pan-STARRS ||  || align=right | 2.7 km || 
|-id=469 bgcolor=#d6d6d6
| 582469 ||  || — || April 5, 2008 || Mount Lemmon || Mount Lemmon Survey ||  || align=right | 2.6 km || 
|-id=470 bgcolor=#d6d6d6
| 582470 ||  || — || September 21, 2009 || Mount Lemmon || Mount Lemmon Survey ||  || align=right | 2.4 km || 
|-id=471 bgcolor=#fefefe
| 582471 ||  || — || October 9, 2008 || Mount Lemmon || Mount Lemmon Survey ||  || align=right data-sort-value="0.78" | 780 m || 
|-id=472 bgcolor=#d6d6d6
| 582472 ||  || — || August 17, 2009 || Kitt Peak || Spacewatch ||  || align=right | 2.7 km || 
|-id=473 bgcolor=#fefefe
| 582473 ||  || — || October 19, 2015 || Haleakala || Pan-STARRS ||  || align=right data-sort-value="0.65" | 650 m || 
|-id=474 bgcolor=#fefefe
| 582474 ||  || — || October 23, 2015 || Mount Lemmon || Mount Lemmon Survey ||  || align=right data-sort-value="0.57" | 570 m || 
|-id=475 bgcolor=#FA8072
| 582475 ||  || — || July 30, 2012 || Haleakala || Pan-STARRS || H || align=right data-sort-value="0.82" | 820 m || 
|-id=476 bgcolor=#d6d6d6
| 582476 ||  || — || March 13, 2013 || Kitt Peak || Spacewatch ||  || align=right | 2.3 km || 
|-id=477 bgcolor=#d6d6d6
| 582477 ||  || — || March 19, 2013 || Haleakala || Pan-STARRS ||  || align=right | 2.2 km || 
|-id=478 bgcolor=#d6d6d6
| 582478 ||  || — || September 25, 2009 || Kitt Peak || Spacewatch ||  || align=right | 2.7 km || 
|-id=479 bgcolor=#fefefe
| 582479 ||  || — || December 21, 2012 || Mount Lemmon || Mount Lemmon Survey ||  || align=right data-sort-value="0.52" | 520 m || 
|-id=480 bgcolor=#fefefe
| 582480 ||  || — || February 15, 2010 || Mount Lemmon || Mount Lemmon Survey ||  || align=right data-sort-value="0.58" | 580 m || 
|-id=481 bgcolor=#fefefe
| 582481 ||  || — || March 16, 2004 || Mauna Kea || Mauna Kea Obs. ||  || align=right data-sort-value="0.74" | 740 m || 
|-id=482 bgcolor=#fefefe
| 582482 ||  || — || September 23, 2008 || Kitt Peak || Spacewatch ||  || align=right data-sort-value="0.75" | 750 m || 
|-id=483 bgcolor=#d6d6d6
| 582483 ||  || — || May 6, 2014 || Haleakala || Pan-STARRS ||  || align=right | 2.2 km || 
|-id=484 bgcolor=#d6d6d6
| 582484 ||  || — || October 5, 2004 || Kitt Peak || Spacewatch ||  || align=right | 2.6 km || 
|-id=485 bgcolor=#fefefe
| 582485 ||  || — || March 31, 2008 || Kitt Peak || Spacewatch ||  || align=right data-sort-value="0.55" | 550 m || 
|-id=486 bgcolor=#fefefe
| 582486 ||  || — || November 2, 2015 || Haleakala || Pan-STARRS ||  || align=right data-sort-value="0.49" | 490 m || 
|-id=487 bgcolor=#fefefe
| 582487 ||  || — || November 6, 2015 || Catalina || CSS ||  || align=right data-sort-value="0.67" | 670 m || 
|-id=488 bgcolor=#E9E9E9
| 582488 ||  || — || October 7, 2007 || Mount Lemmon || Mount Lemmon Survey ||  || align=right | 2.7 km || 
|-id=489 bgcolor=#d6d6d6
| 582489 ||  || — || September 9, 2015 || Haleakala || Pan-STARRS ||  || align=right | 2.5 km || 
|-id=490 bgcolor=#fefefe
| 582490 ||  || — || May 4, 2014 || Haleakala || Pan-STARRS ||  || align=right data-sort-value="0.59" | 590 m || 
|-id=491 bgcolor=#fefefe
| 582491 ||  || — || May 26, 2011 || Mount Lemmon || Mount Lemmon Survey ||  || align=right data-sort-value="0.60" | 600 m || 
|-id=492 bgcolor=#fefefe
| 582492 ||  || — || January 11, 2010 || Kitt Peak || Spacewatch ||  || align=right data-sort-value="0.52" | 520 m || 
|-id=493 bgcolor=#fefefe
| 582493 ||  || — || October 4, 2002 || Palomar || NEAT ||  || align=right data-sort-value="0.63" | 630 m || 
|-id=494 bgcolor=#fefefe
| 582494 ||  || — || October 27, 2012 || Mount Lemmon || Mount Lemmon Survey ||  || align=right data-sort-value="0.46" | 460 m || 
|-id=495 bgcolor=#fefefe
| 582495 ||  || — || March 10, 2010 || La Sagra || OAM Obs. ||  || align=right data-sort-value="0.64" | 640 m || 
|-id=496 bgcolor=#fefefe
| 582496 ||  || — || April 8, 2010 || Kitt Peak || Spacewatch ||  || align=right data-sort-value="0.90" | 900 m || 
|-id=497 bgcolor=#fefefe
| 582497 ||  || — || February 13, 2010 || Mount Lemmon || Mount Lemmon Survey ||  || align=right data-sort-value="0.61" | 610 m || 
|-id=498 bgcolor=#fefefe
| 582498 ||  || — || August 27, 2005 || Palomar || NEAT ||  || align=right data-sort-value="0.59" | 590 m || 
|-id=499 bgcolor=#d6d6d6
| 582499 ||  || — || December 7, 2004 || Socorro || LINEAR ||  || align=right | 2.9 km || 
|-id=500 bgcolor=#fefefe
| 582500 ||  || — || December 23, 2012 || Haleakala || Pan-STARRS ||  || align=right data-sort-value="0.62" | 620 m || 
|}

582501–582600 

|-bgcolor=#fefefe
| 582501 ||  || — || November 19, 2008 || Catalina || CSS ||  || align=right | 1.3 km || 
|-id=502 bgcolor=#fefefe
| 582502 ||  || — || September 6, 2008 || Kitt Peak || Spacewatch ||  || align=right data-sort-value="0.62" | 620 m || 
|-id=503 bgcolor=#fefefe
| 582503 ||  || — || December 1, 2008 || Mount Lemmon || Mount Lemmon Survey ||  || align=right data-sort-value="0.75" | 750 m || 
|-id=504 bgcolor=#fefefe
| 582504 ||  || — || August 24, 2008 || Kitt Peak || Spacewatch || BAP || align=right data-sort-value="0.60" | 600 m || 
|-id=505 bgcolor=#fefefe
| 582505 ||  || — || December 12, 2004 || Anderson Mesa || LONEOS ||  || align=right | 1.4 km || 
|-id=506 bgcolor=#d6d6d6
| 582506 ||  || — || October 7, 2005 || Mauna Kea || Mauna Kea Obs. ||  || align=right | 3.4 km || 
|-id=507 bgcolor=#fefefe
| 582507 ||  || — || November 9, 1996 || Kitt Peak || Spacewatch ||  || align=right data-sort-value="0.63" | 630 m || 
|-id=508 bgcolor=#d6d6d6
| 582508 ||  || — || September 3, 2014 || Catalina || CSS ||  || align=right | 3.9 km || 
|-id=509 bgcolor=#fefefe
| 582509 ||  || — || September 23, 2008 || Mount Lemmon || Mount Lemmon Survey ||  || align=right data-sort-value="0.63" | 630 m || 
|-id=510 bgcolor=#fefefe
| 582510 ||  || — || July 30, 2008 || Mount Lemmon || Mount Lemmon Survey ||  || align=right data-sort-value="0.66" | 660 m || 
|-id=511 bgcolor=#fefefe
| 582511 ||  || — || January 2, 2009 || Mount Lemmon || Mount Lemmon Survey ||  || align=right data-sort-value="0.65" | 650 m || 
|-id=512 bgcolor=#fefefe
| 582512 ||  || — || November 10, 2015 || Mount Lemmon || Mount Lemmon Survey ||  || align=right data-sort-value="0.62" | 620 m || 
|-id=513 bgcolor=#fefefe
| 582513 ||  || — || May 3, 2013 || Haleakala || Pan-STARRS ||  || align=right data-sort-value="0.65" | 650 m || 
|-id=514 bgcolor=#fefefe
| 582514 ||  || — || September 6, 2008 || Kitt Peak || Spacewatch ||  || align=right data-sort-value="0.51" | 510 m || 
|-id=515 bgcolor=#fefefe
| 582515 ||  || — || November 2, 2015 || Mount Lemmon || Mount Lemmon Survey || H || align=right data-sort-value="0.55" | 550 m || 
|-id=516 bgcolor=#fefefe
| 582516 ||  || — || November 10, 2015 || Mount Lemmon || Mount Lemmon Survey ||  || align=right data-sort-value="0.58" | 580 m || 
|-id=517 bgcolor=#fefefe
| 582517 ||  || — || November 14, 2015 || Mount Lemmon || Mount Lemmon Survey ||  || align=right data-sort-value="0.72" | 720 m || 
|-id=518 bgcolor=#d6d6d6
| 582518 ||  || — || November 7, 2015 || Mount Lemmon || Mount Lemmon Survey ||  || align=right | 2.3 km || 
|-id=519 bgcolor=#fefefe
| 582519 ||  || — || January 31, 2009 || Mount Lemmon || Mount Lemmon Survey ||  || align=right data-sort-value="0.64" | 640 m || 
|-id=520 bgcolor=#fefefe
| 582520 ||  || — || January 7, 2006 || Kitt Peak || Spacewatch ||  || align=right data-sort-value="0.60" | 600 m || 
|-id=521 bgcolor=#d6d6d6
| 582521 ||  || — || November 22, 2015 || Mount Lemmon || Mount Lemmon Survey ||  || align=right | 2.4 km || 
|-id=522 bgcolor=#fefefe
| 582522 ||  || — || January 11, 2010 || Kitt Peak || Spacewatch ||  || align=right data-sort-value="0.64" | 640 m || 
|-id=523 bgcolor=#E9E9E9
| 582523 ||  || — || July 25, 2015 || Haleakala || Pan-STARRS ||  || align=right | 1.9 km || 
|-id=524 bgcolor=#fefefe
| 582524 ||  || — || February 26, 2007 || Mount Lemmon || Mount Lemmon Survey ||  || align=right data-sort-value="0.51" | 510 m || 
|-id=525 bgcolor=#E9E9E9
| 582525 ||  || — || October 22, 2006 || Kitt Peak || Spacewatch ||  || align=right | 2.4 km || 
|-id=526 bgcolor=#fefefe
| 582526 ||  || — || February 8, 2013 || Haleakala || Pan-STARRS ||  || align=right data-sort-value="0.56" | 560 m || 
|-id=527 bgcolor=#fefefe
| 582527 ||  || — || August 31, 2005 || Palomar || NEAT ||  || align=right data-sort-value="0.65" | 650 m || 
|-id=528 bgcolor=#fefefe
| 582528 ||  || — || August 20, 2011 || Haleakala || Pan-STARRS ||  || align=right data-sort-value="0.73" | 730 m || 
|-id=529 bgcolor=#d6d6d6
| 582529 ||  || — || September 23, 2015 || Haleakala || Pan-STARRS ||  || align=right | 3.7 km || 
|-id=530 bgcolor=#d6d6d6
| 582530 ||  || — || April 25, 2007 || Mount Lemmon || Mount Lemmon Survey || 7:4 || align=right | 4.8 km || 
|-id=531 bgcolor=#d6d6d6
| 582531 ||  || — || April 26, 2008 || Kitt Peak || Spacewatch ||  || align=right | 3.3 km || 
|-id=532 bgcolor=#d6d6d6
| 582532 ||  || — || December 31, 2011 || Kitt Peak || Spacewatch ||  || align=right | 2.9 km || 
|-id=533 bgcolor=#d6d6d6
| 582533 ||  || — || October 1, 2015 || Mount Lemmon || Mount Lemmon Survey ||  || align=right | 2.8 km || 
|-id=534 bgcolor=#fefefe
| 582534 ||  || — || April 27, 2001 || Kitt Peak || Spacewatch ||  || align=right data-sort-value="0.55" | 550 m || 
|-id=535 bgcolor=#fefefe
| 582535 ||  || — || November 3, 2005 || Mount Lemmon || Mount Lemmon Survey ||  || align=right data-sort-value="0.65" | 650 m || 
|-id=536 bgcolor=#d6d6d6
| 582536 ||  || — || August 28, 2014 || Haleakala || Pan-STARRS ||  || align=right | 2.9 km || 
|-id=537 bgcolor=#fefefe
| 582537 ||  || — || October 8, 2015 || Haleakala || Pan-STARRS ||  || align=right data-sort-value="0.58" | 580 m || 
|-id=538 bgcolor=#fefefe
| 582538 ||  || — || October 9, 2015 || Haleakala || Pan-STARRS ||  || align=right data-sort-value="0.75" | 750 m || 
|-id=539 bgcolor=#fefefe
| 582539 ||  || — || October 8, 2015 || Haleakala || Pan-STARRS ||  || align=right data-sort-value="0.68" | 680 m || 
|-id=540 bgcolor=#E9E9E9
| 582540 ||  || — || November 8, 2007 || Kitt Peak || Spacewatch ||  || align=right data-sort-value="0.86" | 860 m || 
|-id=541 bgcolor=#fefefe
| 582541 ||  || — || October 30, 2008 || Kitt Peak || Spacewatch ||  || align=right data-sort-value="0.55" | 550 m || 
|-id=542 bgcolor=#fefefe
| 582542 ||  || — || March 26, 2003 || Palomar || NEAT ||  || align=right data-sort-value="0.70" | 700 m || 
|-id=543 bgcolor=#fefefe
| 582543 ||  || — || April 16, 2007 || Catalina || CSS ||  || align=right data-sort-value="0.73" | 730 m || 
|-id=544 bgcolor=#d6d6d6
| 582544 ||  || — || April 1, 2012 || Mount Lemmon || Mount Lemmon Survey ||  || align=right | 2.2 km || 
|-id=545 bgcolor=#fefefe
| 582545 ||  || — || October 25, 2008 || Catalina || CSS ||  || align=right data-sort-value="0.68" | 680 m || 
|-id=546 bgcolor=#fefefe
| 582546 ||  || — || December 26, 2005 || Kitt Peak || Spacewatch ||  || align=right data-sort-value="0.69" | 690 m || 
|-id=547 bgcolor=#FA8072
| 582547 ||  || — || December 2, 2015 || Haleakala || Pan-STARRS ||  || align=right data-sort-value="0.83" | 830 m || 
|-id=548 bgcolor=#fefefe
| 582548 ||  || — || September 8, 2011 || Kitt Peak || Spacewatch ||  || align=right data-sort-value="0.74" | 740 m || 
|-id=549 bgcolor=#d6d6d6
| 582549 ||  || — || December 4, 2015 || Haleakala || Pan-STARRS ||  || align=right | 2.8 km || 
|-id=550 bgcolor=#fefefe
| 582550 ||  || — || October 26, 2008 || Mount Lemmon || Mount Lemmon Survey ||  || align=right data-sort-value="0.69" | 690 m || 
|-id=551 bgcolor=#fefefe
| 582551 ||  || — || July 28, 2011 || Haleakala || Pan-STARRS ||  || align=right data-sort-value="0.58" | 580 m || 
|-id=552 bgcolor=#fefefe
| 582552 ||  || — || July 30, 2005 || Palomar || NEAT ||  || align=right data-sort-value="0.48" | 480 m || 
|-id=553 bgcolor=#fefefe
| 582553 ||  || — || March 12, 2010 || Catalina || CSS ||  || align=right data-sort-value="0.84" | 840 m || 
|-id=554 bgcolor=#fefefe
| 582554 ||  || — || September 25, 2011 || Haleakala || Pan-STARRS ||  || align=right data-sort-value="0.71" | 710 m || 
|-id=555 bgcolor=#fefefe
| 582555 ||  || — || September 29, 2008 || Mount Lemmon || Mount Lemmon Survey ||  || align=right data-sort-value="0.68" | 680 m || 
|-id=556 bgcolor=#d6d6d6
| 582556 ||  || — || November 23, 2015 || Haleakala || Pan-STARRS ||  || align=right | 2.5 km || 
|-id=557 bgcolor=#fefefe
| 582557 ||  || — || September 29, 2011 || Mount Lemmon || Mount Lemmon Survey ||  || align=right data-sort-value="0.67" | 670 m || 
|-id=558 bgcolor=#fefefe
| 582558 ||  || — || September 24, 2008 || Mount Lemmon || Mount Lemmon Survey ||  || align=right data-sort-value="0.56" | 560 m || 
|-id=559 bgcolor=#fefefe
| 582559 ||  || — || December 22, 2008 || Mount Lemmon || Mount Lemmon Survey ||  || align=right data-sort-value="0.66" | 660 m || 
|-id=560 bgcolor=#fefefe
| 582560 ||  || — || October 8, 2015 || Mount Lemmon || Mount Lemmon Survey ||  || align=right data-sort-value="0.61" | 610 m || 
|-id=561 bgcolor=#fefefe
| 582561 ||  || — || November 6, 2015 || Haleakala || Pan-STARRS ||  || align=right data-sort-value="0.83" | 830 m || 
|-id=562 bgcolor=#fefefe
| 582562 ||  || — || October 1, 2011 || Kitt Peak || Spacewatch ||  || align=right data-sort-value="0.67" | 670 m || 
|-id=563 bgcolor=#fefefe
| 582563 ||  || — || October 26, 2008 || Kitt Peak || Spacewatch ||  || align=right data-sort-value="0.59" | 590 m || 
|-id=564 bgcolor=#fefefe
| 582564 ||  || — || February 14, 2005 || Kitt Peak || Spacewatch ||  || align=right data-sort-value="0.75" | 750 m || 
|-id=565 bgcolor=#fefefe
| 582565 ||  || — || November 22, 2015 || Mount Lemmon || Mount Lemmon Survey ||  || align=right data-sort-value="0.62" | 620 m || 
|-id=566 bgcolor=#E9E9E9
| 582566 ||  || — || November 3, 2007 || Kitt Peak || Spacewatch ||  || align=right data-sort-value="0.71" | 710 m || 
|-id=567 bgcolor=#fefefe
| 582567 ||  || — || December 4, 2015 || Haleakala || Pan-STARRS ||  || align=right data-sort-value="0.78" | 780 m || 
|-id=568 bgcolor=#fefefe
| 582568 ||  || — || June 6, 2011 || Haleakala || Pan-STARRS ||  || align=right data-sort-value="0.47" | 470 m || 
|-id=569 bgcolor=#E9E9E9
| 582569 ||  || — || November 20, 2015 || Mount Lemmon || Mount Lemmon Survey ||  || align=right | 1.4 km || 
|-id=570 bgcolor=#d6d6d6
| 582570 ||  || — || September 23, 2015 || Haleakala || Pan-STARRS ||  || align=right | 2.5 km || 
|-id=571 bgcolor=#fefefe
| 582571 ||  || — || February 15, 2013 || Haleakala || Pan-STARRS ||  || align=right data-sort-value="0.91" | 910 m || 
|-id=572 bgcolor=#fefefe
| 582572 ||  || — || May 13, 2007 || Mount Lemmon || Mount Lemmon Survey ||  || align=right data-sort-value="0.56" | 560 m || 
|-id=573 bgcolor=#fefefe
| 582573 ||  || — || December 28, 2005 || Kitt Peak || Spacewatch ||  || align=right data-sort-value="0.71" | 710 m || 
|-id=574 bgcolor=#E9E9E9
| 582574 ||  || — || January 10, 2007 || Kitt Peak || Spacewatch ||  || align=right | 2.3 km || 
|-id=575 bgcolor=#fefefe
| 582575 ||  || — || June 11, 2011 || Haleakala || Pan-STARRS ||  || align=right data-sort-value="0.81" | 810 m || 
|-id=576 bgcolor=#E9E9E9
| 582576 ||  || — || April 18, 2013 || Mount Lemmon || Mount Lemmon Survey ||  || align=right | 2.3 km || 
|-id=577 bgcolor=#d6d6d6
| 582577 ||  || — || April 16, 2012 || Haleakala || Pan-STARRS ||  || align=right | 2.2 km || 
|-id=578 bgcolor=#d6d6d6
| 582578 ||  || — || January 13, 2011 || Mount Lemmon || Mount Lemmon Survey ||  || align=right | 2.6 km || 
|-id=579 bgcolor=#fefefe
| 582579 ||  || — || November 11, 2004 || Kitt Peak || Spacewatch ||  || align=right data-sort-value="0.94" | 940 m || 
|-id=580 bgcolor=#fefefe
| 582580 ||  || — || October 3, 2011 || Mount Lemmon || Mount Lemmon Survey ||  || align=right data-sort-value="0.62" | 620 m || 
|-id=581 bgcolor=#fefefe
| 582581 ||  || — || January 20, 2009 || Kitt Peak || Spacewatch ||  || align=right data-sort-value="0.73" | 730 m || 
|-id=582 bgcolor=#d6d6d6
| 582582 ||  || — || June 1, 2014 || Haleakala || Pan-STARRS ||  || align=right | 2.9 km || 
|-id=583 bgcolor=#d6d6d6
| 582583 ||  || — || January 23, 2011 || Mount Lemmon || Mount Lemmon Survey || THM || align=right | 1.6 km || 
|-id=584 bgcolor=#fefefe
| 582584 ||  || — || December 21, 2008 || Mount Lemmon || Mount Lemmon Survey ||  || align=right data-sort-value="0.58" | 580 m || 
|-id=585 bgcolor=#E9E9E9
| 582585 ||  || — || April 17, 2009 || Mount Lemmon || Mount Lemmon Survey ||  || align=right | 2.9 km || 
|-id=586 bgcolor=#fefefe
| 582586 ||  || — || May 28, 2014 || Mount Lemmon || Mount Lemmon Survey ||  || align=right data-sort-value="0.56" | 560 m || 
|-id=587 bgcolor=#fefefe
| 582587 ||  || — || December 3, 2015 || Mount Lemmon || Mount Lemmon Survey ||  || align=right data-sort-value="0.68" | 680 m || 
|-id=588 bgcolor=#fefefe
| 582588 ||  || — || July 7, 2014 || Haleakala || Pan-STARRS ||  || align=right data-sort-value="0.71" | 710 m || 
|-id=589 bgcolor=#fefefe
| 582589 ||  || — || July 1, 2011 || Kitt Peak || Spacewatch ||  || align=right data-sort-value="0.43" | 430 m || 
|-id=590 bgcolor=#d6d6d6
| 582590 ||  || — || June 18, 2013 || Haleakala || Pan-STARRS || 3:2 || align=right | 3.1 km || 
|-id=591 bgcolor=#fefefe
| 582591 ||  || — || May 10, 2003 || Kitt Peak || Spacewatch ||  || align=right data-sort-value="0.51" | 510 m || 
|-id=592 bgcolor=#fefefe
| 582592 ||  || — || December 8, 2015 || Haleakala || Pan-STARRS ||  || align=right data-sort-value="0.67" | 670 m || 
|-id=593 bgcolor=#fefefe
| 582593 ||  || — || August 30, 2014 || Mount Lemmon || Mount Lemmon Survey ||  || align=right data-sort-value="0.57" | 570 m || 
|-id=594 bgcolor=#fefefe
| 582594 ||  || — || June 20, 2014 || Haleakala || Pan-STARRS ||  || align=right data-sort-value="0.64" | 640 m || 
|-id=595 bgcolor=#d6d6d6
| 582595 ||  || — || July 4, 2014 || Haleakala || Pan-STARRS ||  || align=right | 2.1 km || 
|-id=596 bgcolor=#fefefe
| 582596 ||  || — || March 23, 2013 || Mount Lemmon || Mount Lemmon Survey ||  || align=right data-sort-value="0.65" | 650 m || 
|-id=597 bgcolor=#fefefe
| 582597 ||  || — || September 17, 2014 || Haleakala || Pan-STARRS ||  || align=right data-sort-value="0.69" | 690 m || 
|-id=598 bgcolor=#fefefe
| 582598 ||  || — || November 15, 2015 || Haleakala || Pan-STARRS || H || align=right data-sort-value="0.54" | 540 m || 
|-id=599 bgcolor=#E9E9E9
| 582599 ||  || — || February 16, 2013 || Mount Lemmon || Mount Lemmon Survey ||  || align=right | 1.6 km || 
|-id=600 bgcolor=#E9E9E9
| 582600 ||  || — || April 17, 2013 || Haleakala || Pan-STARRS ||  || align=right | 1.4 km || 
|}

582601–582700 

|-bgcolor=#fefefe
| 582601 ||  || — || September 20, 2011 || Kitt Peak || Spacewatch ||  || align=right data-sort-value="0.79" | 790 m || 
|-id=602 bgcolor=#fefefe
| 582602 ||  || — || October 22, 2008 || Kitt Peak || Spacewatch ||  || align=right data-sort-value="0.55" | 550 m || 
|-id=603 bgcolor=#fefefe
| 582603 ||  || — || October 30, 2002 || Palomar || NEAT ||  || align=right data-sort-value="0.60" | 600 m || 
|-id=604 bgcolor=#fefefe
| 582604 ||  || — || November 7, 2008 || Mount Lemmon || Mount Lemmon Survey ||  || align=right data-sort-value="0.54" | 540 m || 
|-id=605 bgcolor=#fefefe
| 582605 ||  || — || October 22, 2008 || Kitt Peak || Spacewatch ||  || align=right data-sort-value="0.55" | 550 m || 
|-id=606 bgcolor=#fefefe
| 582606 ||  || — || November 21, 2008 || Kitt Peak || Spacewatch ||  || align=right data-sort-value="0.81" | 810 m || 
|-id=607 bgcolor=#E9E9E9
| 582607 ||  || — || September 29, 2010 || Mount Lemmon || Mount Lemmon Survey ||  || align=right | 1.8 km || 
|-id=608 bgcolor=#fefefe
| 582608 ||  || — || October 25, 2011 || Haleakala || Pan-STARRS ||  || align=right data-sort-value="0.82" | 820 m || 
|-id=609 bgcolor=#fefefe
| 582609 ||  || — || January 13, 2013 || ESA OGS || ESA OGS ||  || align=right data-sort-value="0.57" | 570 m || 
|-id=610 bgcolor=#fefefe
| 582610 ||  || — || December 9, 2015 || Haleakala || Pan-STARRS || H || align=right data-sort-value="0.59" | 590 m || 
|-id=611 bgcolor=#fefefe
| 582611 ||  || — || October 1, 2011 || Kitt Peak || Spacewatch ||  || align=right data-sort-value="0.64" | 640 m || 
|-id=612 bgcolor=#fefefe
| 582612 ||  || — || December 9, 2015 || Haleakala || Pan-STARRS ||  || align=right data-sort-value="0.86" | 860 m || 
|-id=613 bgcolor=#E9E9E9
| 582613 ||  || — || December 13, 2015 || Haleakala || Pan-STARRS ||  || align=right data-sort-value="0.89" | 890 m || 
|-id=614 bgcolor=#fefefe
| 582614 ||  || — || September 4, 2011 || Haleakala || Pan-STARRS ||  || align=right data-sort-value="0.80" | 800 m || 
|-id=615 bgcolor=#fefefe
| 582615 ||  || — || December 9, 2015 || Haleakala || Pan-STARRS ||  || align=right data-sort-value="0.82" | 820 m || 
|-id=616 bgcolor=#E9E9E9
| 582616 ||  || — || January 25, 2012 || Haleakala || Pan-STARRS ||  || align=right data-sort-value="0.78" | 780 m || 
|-id=617 bgcolor=#E9E9E9
| 582617 ||  || — || July 13, 2013 || Mount Lemmon || Mount Lemmon Survey ||  || align=right data-sort-value="0.98" | 980 m || 
|-id=618 bgcolor=#E9E9E9
| 582618 ||  || — || May 31, 2008 || Mount Lemmon || Mount Lemmon Survey ||  || align=right | 1.6 km || 
|-id=619 bgcolor=#E9E9E9
| 582619 ||  || — || November 16, 2014 || Mount Lemmon || Mount Lemmon Survey ||  || align=right data-sort-value="0.97" | 970 m || 
|-id=620 bgcolor=#fefefe
| 582620 ||  || — || December 13, 2015 || Haleakala || Pan-STARRS ||  || align=right data-sort-value="0.93" | 930 m || 
|-id=621 bgcolor=#E9E9E9
| 582621 ||  || — || February 29, 2012 || Mount Lemmon || Mount Lemmon Survey ||  || align=right | 1.3 km || 
|-id=622 bgcolor=#fefefe
| 582622 ||  || — || August 28, 2014 || Haleakala || Pan-STARRS ||  || align=right data-sort-value="0.98" | 980 m || 
|-id=623 bgcolor=#fefefe
| 582623 ||  || — || October 1, 2014 || Mount Lemmon || Mount Lemmon Survey ||  || align=right data-sort-value="0.70" | 700 m || 
|-id=624 bgcolor=#E9E9E9
| 582624 ||  || — || January 18, 2012 || Catalina || CSS ||  || align=right data-sort-value="0.95" | 950 m || 
|-id=625 bgcolor=#E9E9E9
| 582625 ||  || — || July 31, 2014 || Haleakala || Pan-STARRS ||  || align=right | 1.1 km || 
|-id=626 bgcolor=#fefefe
| 582626 ||  || — || January 15, 2005 || Kitt Peak || Spacewatch ||  || align=right data-sort-value="0.82" | 820 m || 
|-id=627 bgcolor=#E9E9E9
| 582627 ||  || — || December 3, 2010 || Mount Lemmon || Mount Lemmon Survey ||  || align=right data-sort-value="0.96" | 960 m || 
|-id=628 bgcolor=#E9E9E9
| 582628 ||  || — || September 1, 2005 || Palomar || NEAT ||  || align=right | 1.2 km || 
|-id=629 bgcolor=#E9E9E9
| 582629 ||  || — || December 14, 2010 || Mount Lemmon || Mount Lemmon Survey ||  || align=right | 1.8 km || 
|-id=630 bgcolor=#E9E9E9
| 582630 ||  || — || November 11, 2010 || Mount Lemmon || Mount Lemmon Survey ||  || align=right | 1.6 km || 
|-id=631 bgcolor=#E9E9E9
| 582631 ||  || — || October 26, 2014 || Mount Lemmon || Mount Lemmon Survey ||  || align=right | 2.1 km || 
|-id=632 bgcolor=#fefefe
| 582632 ||  || — || December 10, 2015 || Mount Lemmon || Mount Lemmon Survey ||  || align=right | 1.1 km || 
|-id=633 bgcolor=#fefefe
| 582633 ||  || — || December 8, 2015 || Haleakala || Pan-STARRS || H || align=right data-sort-value="0.68" | 680 m || 
|-id=634 bgcolor=#fefefe
| 582634 ||  || — || December 9, 2015 || Haleakala || Pan-STARRS || H || align=right data-sort-value="0.57" | 570 m || 
|-id=635 bgcolor=#E9E9E9
| 582635 ||  || — || December 13, 2015 || Haleakala || Pan-STARRS ||  || align=right | 1.2 km || 
|-id=636 bgcolor=#C2FFFF
| 582636 ||  || — || December 8, 2015 || Mount Lemmon || Mount Lemmon Survey || L5 || align=right | 7.0 km || 
|-id=637 bgcolor=#C2FFFF
| 582637 ||  || — || December 4, 2015 || Haleakala || Pan-STARRS || L5 || align=right | 7.3 km || 
|-id=638 bgcolor=#fefefe
| 582638 ||  || — || December 16, 2015 || Mount Lemmon || Mount Lemmon Survey ||  || align=right data-sort-value="0.76" | 760 m || 
|-id=639 bgcolor=#fefefe
| 582639 ||  || — || September 13, 2007 || Mount Lemmon || Mount Lemmon Survey ||  || align=right data-sort-value="0.77" | 770 m || 
|-id=640 bgcolor=#fefefe
| 582640 ||  || — || December 30, 2015 || Mount Lemmon || Mount Lemmon Survey || H || align=right data-sort-value="0.57" | 570 m || 
|-id=641 bgcolor=#fefefe
| 582641 ||  || — || January 20, 2009 || Mount Lemmon || Mount Lemmon Survey ||  || align=right data-sort-value="0.63" | 630 m || 
|-id=642 bgcolor=#fefefe
| 582642 ||  || — || December 18, 2015 || Mount Lemmon || Mount Lemmon Survey ||  || align=right data-sort-value="0.91" | 910 m || 
|-id=643 bgcolor=#fefefe
| 582643 ||  || — || March 16, 2005 || Mount Lemmon || Mount Lemmon Survey ||  || align=right data-sort-value="0.78" | 780 m || 
|-id=644 bgcolor=#fefefe
| 582644 ||  || — || April 12, 2013 || Haleakala || Pan-STARRS ||  || align=right data-sort-value="0.71" | 710 m || 
|-id=645 bgcolor=#E9E9E9
| 582645 ||  || — || August 23, 2014 || Haleakala || Pan-STARRS ||  || align=right data-sort-value="0.95" | 950 m || 
|-id=646 bgcolor=#fefefe
| 582646 ||  || — || October 25, 2011 || Haleakala || Pan-STARRS ||  || align=right data-sort-value="0.70" | 700 m || 
|-id=647 bgcolor=#fefefe
| 582647 ||  || — || April 19, 2009 || Mount Lemmon || Mount Lemmon Survey ||  || align=right data-sort-value="0.56" | 560 m || 
|-id=648 bgcolor=#fefefe
| 582648 ||  || — || April 21, 2009 || Kitt Peak || Spacewatch ||  || align=right data-sort-value="0.60" | 600 m || 
|-id=649 bgcolor=#fefefe
| 582649 ||  || — || December 18, 2015 || Mount Lemmon || Mount Lemmon Survey ||  || align=right data-sort-value="0.76" | 760 m || 
|-id=650 bgcolor=#fefefe
| 582650 ||  || — || September 26, 2011 || Bergisch Gladbach || W. Bickel ||  || align=right data-sort-value="0.73" | 730 m || 
|-id=651 bgcolor=#fefefe
| 582651 ||  || — || December 30, 2008 || Mount Lemmon || Mount Lemmon Survey ||  || align=right data-sort-value="0.74" | 740 m || 
|-id=652 bgcolor=#fefefe
| 582652 ||  || — || December 9, 2015 || Mount Lemmon || Mount Lemmon Survey ||  || align=right data-sort-value="0.67" | 670 m || 
|-id=653 bgcolor=#fefefe
| 582653 ||  || — || March 10, 2005 || Mount Lemmon || Mount Lemmon Survey ||  || align=right data-sort-value="0.64" | 640 m || 
|-id=654 bgcolor=#fefefe
| 582654 ||  || — || January 25, 2009 || Kitt Peak || Spacewatch ||  || align=right data-sort-value="0.65" | 650 m || 
|-id=655 bgcolor=#E9E9E9
| 582655 ||  || — || January 29, 2012 || Catalina || CSS ||  || align=right | 1.2 km || 
|-id=656 bgcolor=#fefefe
| 582656 ||  || — || July 8, 2014 || Haleakala || Pan-STARRS ||  || align=right data-sort-value="0.65" | 650 m || 
|-id=657 bgcolor=#fefefe
| 582657 ||  || — || December 21, 2008 || Mount Lemmon || Mount Lemmon Survey ||  || align=right data-sort-value="0.90" | 900 m || 
|-id=658 bgcolor=#fefefe
| 582658 ||  || — || October 11, 2007 || Kitt Peak || Spacewatch ||  || align=right data-sort-value="0.62" | 620 m || 
|-id=659 bgcolor=#fefefe
| 582659 ||  || — || August 28, 2014 || Haleakala || Pan-STARRS ||  || align=right data-sort-value="0.74" | 740 m || 
|-id=660 bgcolor=#fefefe
| 582660 ||  || — || January 9, 2006 || Kitt Peak || Spacewatch ||  || align=right data-sort-value="0.63" | 630 m || 
|-id=661 bgcolor=#fefefe
| 582661 ||  || — || November 18, 2011 || Mount Lemmon || Mount Lemmon Survey ||  || align=right data-sort-value="0.76" | 760 m || 
|-id=662 bgcolor=#fefefe
| 582662 ||  || — || February 27, 2009 || Kitt Peak || Spacewatch ||  || align=right data-sort-value="0.79" | 790 m || 
|-id=663 bgcolor=#fefefe
| 582663 ||  || — || November 13, 2015 || Mount Lemmon || Mount Lemmon Survey ||  || align=right data-sort-value="0.58" | 580 m || 
|-id=664 bgcolor=#fefefe
| 582664 ||  || — || December 28, 2005 || Kitt Peak || Spacewatch ||  || align=right data-sort-value="0.66" | 660 m || 
|-id=665 bgcolor=#fefefe
| 582665 ||  || — || August 19, 2014 || Haleakala || Pan-STARRS ||  || align=right data-sort-value="0.56" | 560 m || 
|-id=666 bgcolor=#E9E9E9
| 582666 ||  || — || February 26, 2008 || Mount Lemmon || Mount Lemmon Survey ||  || align=right data-sort-value="0.78" | 780 m || 
|-id=667 bgcolor=#d6d6d6
| 582667 ||  || — || January 4, 2016 || Haleakala || Pan-STARRS ||  || align=right | 2.9 km || 
|-id=668 bgcolor=#fefefe
| 582668 ||  || — || March 26, 2009 || Mount Lemmon || Mount Lemmon Survey ||  || align=right data-sort-value="0.77" | 770 m || 
|-id=669 bgcolor=#fefefe
| 582669 ||  || — || December 10, 2004 || Kitt Peak || Spacewatch ||  || align=right data-sort-value="0.65" | 650 m || 
|-id=670 bgcolor=#fefefe
| 582670 ||  || — || October 24, 2011 || Haleakala || Pan-STARRS ||  || align=right data-sort-value="0.71" | 710 m || 
|-id=671 bgcolor=#fefefe
| 582671 ||  || — || March 16, 2009 || Kitt Peak || Spacewatch ||  || align=right data-sort-value="0.64" | 640 m || 
|-id=672 bgcolor=#d6d6d6
| 582672 ||  || — || November 8, 2007 || Kitt Peak || Spacewatch || 3:2 || align=right | 3.8 km || 
|-id=673 bgcolor=#fefefe
| 582673 ||  || — || December 6, 2015 || Mount Lemmon || Mount Lemmon Survey ||  || align=right data-sort-value="0.80" | 800 m || 
|-id=674 bgcolor=#fefefe
| 582674 ||  || — || October 24, 2005 || Mauna Kea || Mauna Kea Obs. ||  || align=right data-sort-value="0.80" | 800 m || 
|-id=675 bgcolor=#fefefe
| 582675 ||  || — || January 25, 2009 || Kitt Peak || Spacewatch ||  || align=right data-sort-value="0.82" | 820 m || 
|-id=676 bgcolor=#fefefe
| 582676 ||  || — || January 19, 1994 || Kitt Peak || Spacewatch ||  || align=right data-sort-value="0.90" | 900 m || 
|-id=677 bgcolor=#fefefe
| 582677 ||  || — || March 2, 2001 || Kitt Peak || Spacewatch ||  || align=right data-sort-value="0.87" | 870 m || 
|-id=678 bgcolor=#fefefe
| 582678 ||  || — || November 1, 2011 || Kitt Peak || Spacewatch ||  || align=right data-sort-value="0.65" | 650 m || 
|-id=679 bgcolor=#fefefe
| 582679 ||  || — || October 25, 2011 || Haleakala || Pan-STARRS ||  || align=right data-sort-value="0.76" | 760 m || 
|-id=680 bgcolor=#fefefe
| 582680 ||  || — || December 14, 1998 || Kitt Peak || Spacewatch ||  || align=right data-sort-value="0.77" | 770 m || 
|-id=681 bgcolor=#fefefe
| 582681 ||  || — || November 18, 2008 || Kitt Peak || Spacewatch ||  || align=right data-sort-value="0.68" | 680 m || 
|-id=682 bgcolor=#fefefe
| 582682 ||  || — || October 24, 2005 || Mauna Kea || Mauna Kea Obs. ||  || align=right data-sort-value="0.67" | 670 m || 
|-id=683 bgcolor=#fefefe
| 582683 ||  || — || March 13, 2013 || Palomar || PTF ||  || align=right data-sort-value="0.76" | 760 m || 
|-id=684 bgcolor=#E9E9E9
| 582684 ||  || — || November 22, 2015 || Mount Lemmon || Mount Lemmon Survey ||  || align=right data-sort-value="0.70" | 700 m || 
|-id=685 bgcolor=#fefefe
| 582685 ||  || — || December 21, 2008 || Mount Lemmon || Mount Lemmon Survey ||  || align=right data-sort-value="0.80" | 800 m || 
|-id=686 bgcolor=#fefefe
| 582686 ||  || — || January 27, 2006 || Kitt Peak || Spacewatch ||  || align=right | 1.2 km || 
|-id=687 bgcolor=#fefefe
| 582687 ||  || — || January 7, 2016 || Haleakala || Pan-STARRS ||  || align=right data-sort-value="0.73" | 730 m || 
|-id=688 bgcolor=#fefefe
| 582688 ||  || — || November 17, 2001 || Socorro || LINEAR ||  || align=right data-sort-value="0.67" | 670 m || 
|-id=689 bgcolor=#E9E9E9
| 582689 ||  || — || December 31, 2007 || Catalina || CSS ||  || align=right | 1.5 km || 
|-id=690 bgcolor=#fefefe
| 582690 ||  || — || June 20, 2006 || Mount Lemmon || Mount Lemmon Survey ||  || align=right data-sort-value="0.80" | 800 m || 
|-id=691 bgcolor=#fefefe
| 582691 ||  || — || April 11, 2005 || Mount Lemmon || Mount Lemmon Survey ||  || align=right data-sort-value="0.60" | 600 m || 
|-id=692 bgcolor=#fefefe
| 582692 ||  || — || October 18, 2007 || Mount Lemmon || Mount Lemmon Survey ||  || align=right data-sort-value="0.84" | 840 m || 
|-id=693 bgcolor=#fefefe
| 582693 ||  || — || January 7, 2016 || Haleakala || Pan-STARRS ||  || align=right data-sort-value="0.53" | 530 m || 
|-id=694 bgcolor=#fefefe
| 582694 ||  || — || October 14, 2007 || Mount Lemmon || Mount Lemmon Survey ||  || align=right data-sort-value="0.71" | 710 m || 
|-id=695 bgcolor=#fefefe
| 582695 ||  || — || November 21, 2003 || Kitt Peak || Spacewatch ||  || align=right data-sort-value="0.66" | 660 m || 
|-id=696 bgcolor=#fefefe
| 582696 ||  || — || December 31, 2008 || Mount Lemmon || Mount Lemmon Survey ||  || align=right data-sort-value="0.64" | 640 m || 
|-id=697 bgcolor=#fefefe
| 582697 ||  || — || March 11, 2005 || Mount Lemmon || Mount Lemmon Survey ||  || align=right data-sort-value="0.62" | 620 m || 
|-id=698 bgcolor=#fefefe
| 582698 ||  || — || September 28, 2003 || Kitt Peak || Spacewatch ||  || align=right data-sort-value="0.92" | 920 m || 
|-id=699 bgcolor=#fefefe
| 582699 ||  || — || November 12, 2007 || Mount Lemmon || Mount Lemmon Survey ||  || align=right data-sort-value="0.73" | 730 m || 
|-id=700 bgcolor=#fefefe
| 582700 ||  || — || March 29, 2009 || Kitt Peak || Spacewatch ||  || align=right data-sort-value="0.85" | 850 m || 
|}

582701–582800 

|-bgcolor=#E9E9E9
| 582701 ||  || — || July 2, 2005 || Kitt Peak || Spacewatch ||  || align=right | 1.4 km || 
|-id=702 bgcolor=#fefefe
| 582702 ||  || — || May 15, 2013 || Haleakala || Pan-STARRS ||  || align=right data-sort-value="0.89" | 890 m || 
|-id=703 bgcolor=#E9E9E9
| 582703 ||  || — || February 27, 2012 || Kitt Peak || Spacewatch ||  || align=right | 1.4 km || 
|-id=704 bgcolor=#E9E9E9
| 582704 ||  || — || March 13, 2012 || Mount Lemmon || Mount Lemmon Survey ||  || align=right | 1.2 km || 
|-id=705 bgcolor=#fefefe
| 582705 ||  || — || September 17, 2014 || Haleakala || Pan-STARRS ||  || align=right data-sort-value="0.75" | 750 m || 
|-id=706 bgcolor=#fefefe
| 582706 ||  || — || June 19, 2010 || Mount Lemmon || Mount Lemmon Survey ||  || align=right data-sort-value="0.87" | 870 m || 
|-id=707 bgcolor=#fefefe
| 582707 ||  || — || December 24, 2011 || Mount Lemmon || Mount Lemmon Survey ||  || align=right data-sort-value="0.60" | 600 m || 
|-id=708 bgcolor=#fefefe
| 582708 ||  || — || January 1, 2012 || Mount Lemmon || Mount Lemmon Survey ||  || align=right data-sort-value="0.75" | 750 m || 
|-id=709 bgcolor=#d6d6d6
| 582709 ||  || — || January 8, 2016 || Haleakala || Pan-STARRS ||  || align=right | 3.2 km || 
|-id=710 bgcolor=#E9E9E9
| 582710 ||  || — || April 18, 2012 || Kitt Peak || Spacewatch || JUN || align=right data-sort-value="0.92" | 920 m || 
|-id=711 bgcolor=#E9E9E9
| 582711 ||  || — || January 8, 2016 || Haleakala || Pan-STARRS ||  || align=right | 1.2 km || 
|-id=712 bgcolor=#fefefe
| 582712 ||  || — || January 8, 2016 || Haleakala || Pan-STARRS ||  || align=right data-sort-value="0.82" | 820 m || 
|-id=713 bgcolor=#E9E9E9
| 582713 ||  || — || October 29, 2014 || Haleakala || Pan-STARRS ||  || align=right | 1.3 km || 
|-id=714 bgcolor=#E9E9E9
| 582714 ||  || — || October 25, 2005 || Kitt Peak || Spacewatch ||  || align=right | 2.1 km || 
|-id=715 bgcolor=#E9E9E9
| 582715 ||  || — || October 31, 2010 || Mount Lemmon || Mount Lemmon Survey ||  || align=right | 1.1 km || 
|-id=716 bgcolor=#fefefe
| 582716 ||  || — || July 1, 2014 || Haleakala || Pan-STARRS ||  || align=right data-sort-value="0.54" | 540 m || 
|-id=717 bgcolor=#fefefe
| 582717 ||  || — || March 8, 2005 || Kitt Peak || Spacewatch ||  || align=right data-sort-value="0.84" | 840 m || 
|-id=718 bgcolor=#E9E9E9
| 582718 ||  || — || January 7, 2016 || Haleakala || Pan-STARRS ||  || align=right data-sort-value="0.73" | 730 m || 
|-id=719 bgcolor=#E9E9E9
| 582719 ||  || — || March 15, 2004 || Palomar || NEAT || EUN || align=right | 1.4 km || 
|-id=720 bgcolor=#fefefe
| 582720 ||  || — || January 11, 2016 || MARGO, Nauchnij || G. Borisov || H || align=right data-sort-value="0.71" | 710 m || 
|-id=721 bgcolor=#fefefe
| 582721 ||  || — || November 24, 2003 || Kitt Peak || Spacewatch ||  || align=right | 1.1 km || 
|-id=722 bgcolor=#E9E9E9
| 582722 ||  || — || February 28, 2008 || Kitt Peak || Spacewatch ||  || align=right | 1.1 km || 
|-id=723 bgcolor=#fefefe
| 582723 ||  || — || March 25, 2006 || Palomar || NEAT ||  || align=right data-sort-value="0.90" | 900 m || 
|-id=724 bgcolor=#fefefe
| 582724 ||  || — || May 13, 2009 || Kitt Peak || Spacewatch ||  || align=right data-sort-value="0.67" | 670 m || 
|-id=725 bgcolor=#fefefe
| 582725 ||  || — || March 4, 2005 || Mount Lemmon || Mount Lemmon Survey || MAS || align=right data-sort-value="0.68" | 680 m || 
|-id=726 bgcolor=#fefefe
| 582726 ||  || — || December 13, 2012 || Piszkesteto || K. Sárneczky || H || align=right data-sort-value="0.59" | 590 m || 
|-id=727 bgcolor=#E9E9E9
| 582727 ||  || — || July 28, 2014 || Haleakala || Pan-STARRS ||  || align=right | 1.1 km || 
|-id=728 bgcolor=#fefefe
| 582728 ||  || — || February 6, 2005 || Bergisch Gladbach || W. Bickel || MAS || align=right data-sort-value="0.54" | 540 m || 
|-id=729 bgcolor=#fefefe
| 582729 ||  || — || April 22, 2013 || Mount Lemmon || Mount Lemmon Survey ||  || align=right data-sort-value="0.77" | 770 m || 
|-id=730 bgcolor=#E9E9E9
| 582730 ||  || — || January 29, 2012 || Mount Lemmon || Mount Lemmon Survey ||  || align=right | 1.1 km || 
|-id=731 bgcolor=#E9E9E9
| 582731 ||  || — || February 3, 2008 || Catalina || CSS ||  || align=right | 1.0 km || 
|-id=732 bgcolor=#C2FFFF
| 582732 ||  || — || October 31, 2013 || Kitt Peak || Spacewatch || L5 || align=right | 8.0 km || 
|-id=733 bgcolor=#fefefe
| 582733 ||  || — || January 11, 2016 || Haleakala || Pan-STARRS || H || align=right data-sort-value="0.62" | 620 m || 
|-id=734 bgcolor=#fefefe
| 582734 ||  || — || January 4, 2016 || Haleakala || Pan-STARRS ||  || align=right data-sort-value="0.59" | 590 m || 
|-id=735 bgcolor=#d6d6d6
| 582735 ||  || — || January 8, 2016 || Haleakala || Pan-STARRS ||  || align=right | 2.5 km || 
|-id=736 bgcolor=#E9E9E9
| 582736 ||  || — || August 9, 2013 || Haleakala || Pan-STARRS ||  || align=right | 1.5 km || 
|-id=737 bgcolor=#d6d6d6
| 582737 ||  || — || January 3, 2016 || Mount Lemmon || Mount Lemmon Survey ||  || align=right | 2.9 km || 
|-id=738 bgcolor=#E9E9E9
| 582738 ||  || — || January 12, 2016 || Kitt Peak || Spacewatch ||  || align=right data-sort-value="0.96" | 960 m || 
|-id=739 bgcolor=#E9E9E9
| 582739 ||  || — || February 24, 2003 || Campo Imperatore || CINEOS ||  || align=right | 1.4 km || 
|-id=740 bgcolor=#E9E9E9
| 582740 ||  || — || February 21, 2007 || Mount Lemmon || Mount Lemmon Survey ||  || align=right | 1.9 km || 
|-id=741 bgcolor=#d6d6d6
| 582741 ||  || — || January 28, 2006 || Kitt Peak || Spacewatch ||  || align=right | 3.1 km || 
|-id=742 bgcolor=#fefefe
| 582742 ||  || — || October 26, 2011 || Haleakala || Pan-STARRS ||  || align=right data-sort-value="0.69" | 690 m || 
|-id=743 bgcolor=#E9E9E9
| 582743 ||  || — || January 24, 2007 || Mount Lemmon || Mount Lemmon Survey ||  || align=right | 1.5 km || 
|-id=744 bgcolor=#E9E9E9
| 582744 ||  || — || October 13, 2010 || Mount Lemmon || Mount Lemmon Survey ||  || align=right | 1.3 km || 
|-id=745 bgcolor=#fefefe
| 582745 ||  || — || May 15, 2013 || Haleakala || Pan-STARRS ||  || align=right data-sort-value="0.69" | 690 m || 
|-id=746 bgcolor=#fefefe
| 582746 ||  || — || January 3, 2016 || Haleakala || Pan-STARRS ||  || align=right data-sort-value="0.67" | 670 m || 
|-id=747 bgcolor=#fefefe
| 582747 ||  || — || May 9, 2013 || Haleakala || Pan-STARRS ||  || align=right data-sort-value="0.60" | 600 m || 
|-id=748 bgcolor=#E9E9E9
| 582748 ||  || — || March 1, 2012 || Mount Lemmon || Mount Lemmon Survey ||  || align=right data-sort-value="0.70" | 700 m || 
|-id=749 bgcolor=#fefefe
| 582749 ||  || — || January 8, 2016 || Haleakala || Pan-STARRS ||  || align=right data-sort-value="0.71" | 710 m || 
|-id=750 bgcolor=#E9E9E9
| 582750 ||  || — || July 14, 2013 || Haleakala || Pan-STARRS ||  || align=right data-sort-value="0.91" | 910 m || 
|-id=751 bgcolor=#E9E9E9
| 582751 ||  || — || February 13, 2008 || Mount Lemmon || Mount Lemmon Survey ||  || align=right | 1.3 km || 
|-id=752 bgcolor=#fefefe
| 582752 ||  || — || March 29, 2009 || Kitt Peak || Spacewatch ||  || align=right data-sort-value="0.72" | 720 m || 
|-id=753 bgcolor=#E9E9E9
| 582753 ||  || — || March 14, 2012 || Kitt Peak || Spacewatch ||  || align=right data-sort-value="0.76" | 760 m || 
|-id=754 bgcolor=#fefefe
| 582754 ||  || — || January 31, 2009 || Mount Lemmon || Mount Lemmon Survey ||  || align=right data-sort-value="0.64" | 640 m || 
|-id=755 bgcolor=#E9E9E9
| 582755 ||  || — || February 13, 2008 || Mount Lemmon || Mount Lemmon Survey ||  || align=right | 1.1 km || 
|-id=756 bgcolor=#E9E9E9
| 582756 ||  || — || March 5, 2008 || Catalina || CSS ||  || align=right | 1.3 km || 
|-id=757 bgcolor=#fefefe
| 582757 ||  || — || July 28, 2014 || Haleakala || Pan-STARRS ||  || align=right data-sort-value="0.59" | 590 m || 
|-id=758 bgcolor=#fefefe
| 582758 ||  || — || March 3, 2009 || Mount Lemmon || Mount Lemmon Survey ||  || align=right data-sort-value="0.62" | 620 m || 
|-id=759 bgcolor=#d6d6d6
| 582759 ||  || — || December 18, 2015 || Mount Lemmon || Mount Lemmon Survey ||  || align=right | 3.5 km || 
|-id=760 bgcolor=#fefefe
| 582760 ||  || — || August 20, 2014 || Haleakala || Pan-STARRS ||  || align=right data-sort-value="0.64" | 640 m || 
|-id=761 bgcolor=#fefefe
| 582761 ||  || — || December 29, 2011 || Kitt Peak || Spacewatch ||  || align=right data-sort-value="0.67" | 670 m || 
|-id=762 bgcolor=#fefefe
| 582762 ||  || — || January 8, 2016 || Haleakala || Pan-STARRS ||  || align=right data-sort-value="0.67" | 670 m || 
|-id=763 bgcolor=#E9E9E9
| 582763 ||  || — || September 16, 2006 || Kitt Peak || Spacewatch ||  || align=right data-sort-value="0.68" | 680 m || 
|-id=764 bgcolor=#E9E9E9
| 582764 ||  || — || March 10, 2008 || Kitt Peak || Spacewatch ||  || align=right data-sort-value="0.83" | 830 m || 
|-id=765 bgcolor=#E9E9E9
| 582765 ||  || — || August 12, 2013 || Haleakala || Pan-STARRS ||  || align=right | 1.0 km || 
|-id=766 bgcolor=#E9E9E9
| 582766 ||  || — || November 16, 2006 || Kitt Peak || Spacewatch ||  || align=right | 1.2 km || 
|-id=767 bgcolor=#E9E9E9
| 582767 ||  || — || November 9, 2014 || Mount Lemmon || Mount Lemmon Survey ||  || align=right | 1.3 km || 
|-id=768 bgcolor=#E9E9E9
| 582768 ||  || — || September 19, 2014 || Haleakala || Pan-STARRS ||  || align=right data-sort-value="0.79" | 790 m || 
|-id=769 bgcolor=#fefefe
| 582769 ||  || — || April 14, 2005 || Kitt Peak || Spacewatch ||  || align=right data-sort-value="0.97" | 970 m || 
|-id=770 bgcolor=#fefefe
| 582770 ||  || — || May 15, 2013 || Haleakala || Pan-STARRS ||  || align=right data-sort-value="0.80" | 800 m || 
|-id=771 bgcolor=#E9E9E9
| 582771 ||  || — || November 11, 2010 || Mount Lemmon || Mount Lemmon Survey ||  || align=right data-sort-value="0.87" | 870 m || 
|-id=772 bgcolor=#fefefe
| 582772 ||  || — || December 1, 2014 || Kitt Peak || Spacewatch ||  || align=right data-sort-value="0.80" | 800 m || 
|-id=773 bgcolor=#d6d6d6
| 582773 ||  || — || October 2, 2014 || Haleakala || Pan-STARRS ||  || align=right | 2.3 km || 
|-id=774 bgcolor=#E9E9E9
| 582774 ||  || — || January 14, 1996 || Kitt Peak || Spacewatch ||  || align=right | 1.1 km || 
|-id=775 bgcolor=#E9E9E9
| 582775 ||  || — || January 8, 2016 || Haleakala || Pan-STARRS ||  || align=right data-sort-value="0.95" | 950 m || 
|-id=776 bgcolor=#fefefe
| 582776 ||  || — || January 13, 2016 || Haleakala || Pan-STARRS ||  || align=right data-sort-value="0.59" | 590 m || 
|-id=777 bgcolor=#C2FFFF
| 582777 ||  || — || January 9, 2016 || Haleakala || Pan-STARRS || L5 || align=right | 7.2 km || 
|-id=778 bgcolor=#E9E9E9
| 582778 ||  || — || January 8, 2016 || Haleakala || Pan-STARRS ||  || align=right data-sort-value="0.98" | 980 m || 
|-id=779 bgcolor=#fefefe
| 582779 ||  || — || January 7, 2016 || Haleakala || Pan-STARRS ||  || align=right data-sort-value="0.75" | 750 m || 
|-id=780 bgcolor=#fefefe
| 582780 ||  || — || October 2, 2014 || Kitt Peak || Spacewatch ||  || align=right data-sort-value="0.72" | 720 m || 
|-id=781 bgcolor=#d6d6d6
| 582781 ||  || — || January 11, 2016 || Haleakala || Pan-STARRS ||  || align=right | 2.3 km || 
|-id=782 bgcolor=#d6d6d6
| 582782 ||  || — || January 7, 2016 || Haleakala || Pan-STARRS || 7:4 || align=right | 3.2 km || 
|-id=783 bgcolor=#E9E9E9
| 582783 ||  || — || January 9, 2007 || Kitt Peak || Spacewatch ||  || align=right | 1.5 km || 
|-id=784 bgcolor=#E9E9E9
| 582784 ||  || — || April 27, 2012 || Haleakala || Pan-STARRS ||  || align=right | 1.3 km || 
|-id=785 bgcolor=#E9E9E9
| 582785 ||  || — || January 8, 2016 || Haleakala || Pan-STARRS ||  || align=right data-sort-value="0.83" | 830 m || 
|-id=786 bgcolor=#E9E9E9
| 582786 ||  || — || April 21, 2012 || Haleakala || Pan-STARRS ||  || align=right | 1.1 km || 
|-id=787 bgcolor=#fefefe
| 582787 ||  || — || August 27, 2014 || Haleakala || Pan-STARRS ||  || align=right data-sort-value="0.82" | 820 m || 
|-id=788 bgcolor=#d6d6d6
| 582788 ||  || — || February 26, 2011 || Mount Lemmon || Mount Lemmon Survey ||  || align=right | 2.7 km || 
|-id=789 bgcolor=#fefefe
| 582789 ||  || — || February 2, 2005 || Kitt Peak || Spacewatch ||  || align=right data-sort-value="0.57" | 570 m || 
|-id=790 bgcolor=#fefefe
| 582790 ||  || — || December 4, 2007 || Kitt Peak || Spacewatch ||  || align=right data-sort-value="0.88" | 880 m || 
|-id=791 bgcolor=#fefefe
| 582791 ||  || — || February 18, 2005 || La Silla || A. Boattini ||  || align=right data-sort-value="0.77" | 770 m || 
|-id=792 bgcolor=#E9E9E9
| 582792 ||  || — || July 8, 2013 || Haleakala || Pan-STARRS ||  || align=right data-sort-value="0.98" | 980 m || 
|-id=793 bgcolor=#fefefe
| 582793 ||  || — || October 9, 2007 || Mount Lemmon || Mount Lemmon Survey ||  || align=right data-sort-value="0.62" | 620 m || 
|-id=794 bgcolor=#E9E9E9
| 582794 ||  || — || February 23, 2012 || Mount Lemmon || Mount Lemmon Survey ||  || align=right | 1.5 km || 
|-id=795 bgcolor=#fefefe
| 582795 ||  || — || March 10, 2005 || Mount Lemmon || Mount Lemmon Survey ||  || align=right data-sort-value="0.58" | 580 m || 
|-id=796 bgcolor=#E9E9E9
| 582796 ||  || — || October 21, 2006 || Mount Lemmon || Mount Lemmon Survey ||  || align=right | 1.3 km || 
|-id=797 bgcolor=#fefefe
| 582797 ||  || — || March 9, 2002 || Palomar || NEAT ||  || align=right data-sort-value="0.86" | 860 m || 
|-id=798 bgcolor=#fefefe
| 582798 ||  || — || September 25, 1998 || Kitt Peak || Spacewatch ||  || align=right data-sort-value="0.82" | 820 m || 
|-id=799 bgcolor=#E9E9E9
| 582799 ||  || — || March 1, 2008 || Kitt Peak || Spacewatch ||  || align=right data-sort-value="0.75" | 750 m || 
|-id=800 bgcolor=#fefefe
| 582800 ||  || — || October 26, 2011 || Haleakala || Pan-STARRS ||  || align=right data-sort-value="0.67" | 670 m || 
|}

582801–582900 

|-bgcolor=#fefefe
| 582801 ||  || — || October 7, 2005 || Mauna Kea || Mauna Kea Obs. ||  || align=right data-sort-value="0.60" | 600 m || 
|-id=802 bgcolor=#fefefe
| 582802 ||  || — || December 5, 2007 || Kitt Peak || Spacewatch ||  || align=right data-sort-value="0.87" | 870 m || 
|-id=803 bgcolor=#fefefe
| 582803 ||  || — || October 26, 2011 || Haleakala || Pan-STARRS ||  || align=right data-sort-value="0.75" | 750 m || 
|-id=804 bgcolor=#fefefe
| 582804 ||  || — || April 12, 2013 || Haleakala || Pan-STARRS ||  || align=right data-sort-value="0.71" | 710 m || 
|-id=805 bgcolor=#fefefe
| 582805 ||  || — || November 28, 2011 || Kitt Peak || Spacewatch ||  || align=right data-sort-value="0.76" | 760 m || 
|-id=806 bgcolor=#fefefe
| 582806 ||  || — || August 9, 2007 || Kitt Peak || Spacewatch ||  || align=right data-sort-value="0.79" | 790 m || 
|-id=807 bgcolor=#E9E9E9
| 582807 ||  || — || April 6, 2008 || Kitt Peak || Spacewatch ||  || align=right | 1.00 km || 
|-id=808 bgcolor=#E9E9E9
| 582808 ||  || — || March 10, 2008 || Kitt Peak || Spacewatch ||  || align=right data-sort-value="0.75" | 750 m || 
|-id=809 bgcolor=#fefefe
| 582809 ||  || — || January 14, 2016 || Haleakala || Pan-STARRS ||  || align=right data-sort-value="0.80" | 800 m || 
|-id=810 bgcolor=#fefefe
| 582810 ||  || — || August 21, 2004 || Mauna Kea || Mauna Kea Obs. ||  || align=right data-sort-value="0.55" | 550 m || 
|-id=811 bgcolor=#d6d6d6
| 582811 ||  || — || January 17, 2016 || Haleakala || Pan-STARRS ||  || align=right | 2.9 km || 
|-id=812 bgcolor=#E9E9E9
| 582812 ||  || — || January 18, 2016 || Haleakala || Pan-STARRS ||  || align=right data-sort-value="0.97" | 970 m || 
|-id=813 bgcolor=#E9E9E9
| 582813 ||  || — || April 13, 2008 || Mount Lemmon || Mount Lemmon Survey ||  || align=right data-sort-value="0.82" | 820 m || 
|-id=814 bgcolor=#fefefe
| 582814 ||  || — || March 18, 2009 || Kitt Peak || Spacewatch ||  || align=right data-sort-value="0.75" | 750 m || 
|-id=815 bgcolor=#E9E9E9
| 582815 ||  || — || November 29, 2014 || Mount Lemmon || Mount Lemmon Survey ||  || align=right | 1.7 km || 
|-id=816 bgcolor=#E9E9E9
| 582816 ||  || — || July 1, 2008 || Kitt Peak || Spacewatch ||  || align=right | 1.9 km || 
|-id=817 bgcolor=#E9E9E9
| 582817 ||  || — || January 28, 2011 || Mount Lemmon || Mount Lemmon Survey ||  || align=right | 1.5 km || 
|-id=818 bgcolor=#E9E9E9
| 582818 ||  || — || January 18, 2016 || Haleakala || Pan-STARRS ||  || align=right | 1.8 km || 
|-id=819 bgcolor=#E9E9E9
| 582819 ||  || — || March 29, 2008 || Kitt Peak || Spacewatch ||  || align=right | 1.4 km || 
|-id=820 bgcolor=#fefefe
| 582820 ||  || — || April 28, 2009 || Mount Lemmon || Mount Lemmon Survey ||  || align=right data-sort-value="0.62" | 620 m || 
|-id=821 bgcolor=#fefefe
| 582821 ||  || — || November 13, 2010 || Mount Lemmon || Mount Lemmon Survey ||  || align=right data-sort-value="0.92" | 920 m || 
|-id=822 bgcolor=#E9E9E9
| 582822 ||  || — || August 8, 2013 || Haleakala || Pan-STARRS ||  || align=right | 1.1 km || 
|-id=823 bgcolor=#fefefe
| 582823 ||  || — || September 2, 2010 || Mount Lemmon || Mount Lemmon Survey ||  || align=right data-sort-value="0.81" | 810 m || 
|-id=824 bgcolor=#E9E9E9
| 582824 ||  || — || March 31, 2003 || Apache Point || SDSS Collaboration ||  || align=right | 1.2 km || 
|-id=825 bgcolor=#E9E9E9
| 582825 ||  || — || January 26, 2011 || Mount Lemmon || Mount Lemmon Survey ||  || align=right | 1.4 km || 
|-id=826 bgcolor=#E9E9E9
| 582826 ||  || — || March 25, 2012 || Mount Lemmon || Mount Lemmon Survey ||  || align=right data-sort-value="0.83" | 830 m || 
|-id=827 bgcolor=#fefefe
| 582827 ||  || — || November 2, 2010 || Kitt Peak || Spacewatch ||  || align=right data-sort-value="0.88" | 880 m || 
|-id=828 bgcolor=#E9E9E9
| 582828 ||  || — || January 18, 2016 || Haleakala || Pan-STARRS ||  || align=right data-sort-value="0.84" | 840 m || 
|-id=829 bgcolor=#E9E9E9
| 582829 ||  || — || January 16, 2016 || Haleakala || Pan-STARRS ||  || align=right data-sort-value="0.88" | 880 m || 
|-id=830 bgcolor=#E9E9E9
| 582830 ||  || — || March 29, 2012 || Kitt Peak || Spacewatch ||  || align=right | 1.0 km || 
|-id=831 bgcolor=#fefefe
| 582831 ||  || — || January 19, 2016 || Mount Lemmon || Mount Lemmon Survey ||  || align=right data-sort-value="0.58" | 580 m || 
|-id=832 bgcolor=#E9E9E9
| 582832 ||  || — || March 3, 2008 || XuYi || PMO NEO ||  || align=right data-sort-value="0.67" | 670 m || 
|-id=833 bgcolor=#fefefe
| 582833 ||  || — || January 4, 2016 || Haleakala || Pan-STARRS ||  || align=right data-sort-value="0.54" | 540 m || 
|-id=834 bgcolor=#E9E9E9
| 582834 ||  || — || February 3, 2012 || Haleakala || Pan-STARRS ||  || align=right data-sort-value="0.67" | 670 m || 
|-id=835 bgcolor=#fefefe
| 582835 ||  || — || March 17, 2009 || Kitt Peak || Spacewatch ||  || align=right data-sort-value="0.66" | 660 m || 
|-id=836 bgcolor=#E9E9E9
| 582836 ||  || — || February 12, 2004 || Kitt Peak || Spacewatch ||  || align=right data-sort-value="0.72" | 720 m || 
|-id=837 bgcolor=#fefefe
| 582837 ||  || — || February 1, 2009 || Kitt Peak || Spacewatch ||  || align=right data-sort-value="0.57" | 570 m || 
|-id=838 bgcolor=#E9E9E9
| 582838 ||  || — || August 28, 2014 || Haleakala || Pan-STARRS ||  || align=right data-sort-value="0.64" | 640 m || 
|-id=839 bgcolor=#fefefe
| 582839 ||  || — || January 20, 2009 || Mount Lemmon || Mount Lemmon Survey ||  || align=right data-sort-value="0.51" | 510 m || 
|-id=840 bgcolor=#fefefe
| 582840 ||  || — || October 19, 2003 || Apache Point || SDSS Collaboration ||  || align=right data-sort-value="0.90" | 900 m || 
|-id=841 bgcolor=#E9E9E9
| 582841 ||  || — || February 2, 2008 || Kitt Peak || Spacewatch ||  || align=right data-sort-value="0.74" | 740 m || 
|-id=842 bgcolor=#fefefe
| 582842 ||  || — || February 1, 2009 || Mount Lemmon || Mount Lemmon Survey ||  || align=right data-sort-value="0.80" | 800 m || 
|-id=843 bgcolor=#fefefe
| 582843 ||  || — || January 4, 2016 || Haleakala || Pan-STARRS ||  || align=right data-sort-value="0.92" | 920 m || 
|-id=844 bgcolor=#fefefe
| 582844 ||  || — || July 12, 2007 || La Sagra || OAM Obs. ||  || align=right data-sort-value="0.76" | 760 m || 
|-id=845 bgcolor=#fefefe
| 582845 ||  || — || November 17, 2008 || Kitt Peak || Spacewatch ||  || align=right data-sort-value="0.52" | 520 m || 
|-id=846 bgcolor=#E9E9E9
| 582846 ||  || — || December 13, 2006 || Kitt Peak || Spacewatch ||  || align=right | 1.2 km || 
|-id=847 bgcolor=#fefefe
| 582847 ||  || — || February 27, 2009 || Mount Lemmon || Mount Lemmon Survey ||  || align=right data-sort-value="0.75" | 750 m || 
|-id=848 bgcolor=#fefefe
| 582848 ||  || — || September 2, 2014 || Mount Lemmon || Mount Lemmon Survey ||  || align=right data-sort-value="0.66" | 660 m || 
|-id=849 bgcolor=#fefefe
| 582849 ||  || — || August 31, 2014 || Mount Lemmon || Mount Lemmon Survey ||  || align=right data-sort-value="0.68" | 680 m || 
|-id=850 bgcolor=#fefefe
| 582850 ||  || — || October 22, 2003 || Apache Point || SDSS Collaboration ||  || align=right data-sort-value="0.77" | 770 m || 
|-id=851 bgcolor=#fefefe
| 582851 ||  || — || April 11, 2005 || Mount Lemmon || Mount Lemmon Survey ||  || align=right data-sort-value="0.73" | 730 m || 
|-id=852 bgcolor=#d6d6d6
| 582852 ||  || — || June 28, 2006 || Siding Spring || SSS || Tj (2.98) || align=right | 3.5 km || 
|-id=853 bgcolor=#fefefe
| 582853 ||  || — || March 28, 2009 || Kitt Peak || Spacewatch ||  || align=right data-sort-value="0.78" | 780 m || 
|-id=854 bgcolor=#fefefe
| 582854 ||  || — || November 25, 2011 || Haleakala || Pan-STARRS ||  || align=right data-sort-value="0.78" | 780 m || 
|-id=855 bgcolor=#fefefe
| 582855 ||  || — || August 15, 2014 || Haleakala || Pan-STARRS ||  || align=right data-sort-value="0.63" | 630 m || 
|-id=856 bgcolor=#fefefe
| 582856 ||  || — || April 30, 2009 || Kitt Peak || Spacewatch ||  || align=right data-sort-value="0.62" | 620 m || 
|-id=857 bgcolor=#fefefe
| 582857 ||  || — || July 25, 2014 || Haleakala || Pan-STARRS ||  || align=right data-sort-value="0.60" | 600 m || 
|-id=858 bgcolor=#fefefe
| 582858 ||  || — || March 20, 1999 || Apache Point || SDSS Collaboration ||  || align=right data-sort-value="0.84" | 840 m || 
|-id=859 bgcolor=#fefefe
| 582859 ||  || — || December 29, 2011 || Kitt Peak || Spacewatch ||  || align=right data-sort-value="0.62" | 620 m || 
|-id=860 bgcolor=#fefefe
| 582860 ||  || — || January 18, 2012 || Mount Lemmon || Mount Lemmon Survey ||  || align=right data-sort-value="0.81" | 810 m || 
|-id=861 bgcolor=#fefefe
| 582861 ||  || — || April 19, 2009 || Mount Lemmon || Mount Lemmon Survey ||  || align=right data-sort-value="0.78" | 780 m || 
|-id=862 bgcolor=#fefefe
| 582862 ||  || — || February 3, 2016 || Haleakala || Pan-STARRS ||  || align=right data-sort-value="0.98" | 980 m || 
|-id=863 bgcolor=#E9E9E9
| 582863 ||  || — || May 10, 2004 || Catalina || CSS ||  || align=right | 1.8 km || 
|-id=864 bgcolor=#fefefe
| 582864 ||  || — || November 18, 2014 || Mount Lemmon || Mount Lemmon Survey ||  || align=right data-sort-value="0.74" | 740 m || 
|-id=865 bgcolor=#E9E9E9
| 582865 ||  || — || January 16, 2016 || Mount Lemmon || Mount Lemmon Survey ||  || align=right | 1.8 km || 
|-id=866 bgcolor=#E9E9E9
| 582866 ||  || — || February 4, 2016 || Haleakala || Pan-STARRS ||  || align=right data-sort-value="0.76" | 760 m || 
|-id=867 bgcolor=#fefefe
| 582867 ||  || — || December 20, 2004 || Mount Lemmon || Mount Lemmon Survey ||  || align=right data-sort-value="0.85" | 850 m || 
|-id=868 bgcolor=#E9E9E9
| 582868 ||  || — || February 1, 2012 || Mount Lemmon || Mount Lemmon Survey ||  || align=right | 1.3 km || 
|-id=869 bgcolor=#E9E9E9
| 582869 ||  || — || March 29, 2008 || Catalina || CSS ||  || align=right data-sort-value="0.97" | 970 m || 
|-id=870 bgcolor=#E9E9E9
| 582870 ||  || — || March 14, 2012 || Haleakala || Pan-STARRS ||  || align=right data-sort-value="0.85" | 850 m || 
|-id=871 bgcolor=#fefefe
| 582871 ||  || — || May 2, 2009 || Cerro Burek || Alianza S4 Obs. ||  || align=right data-sort-value="0.82" | 820 m || 
|-id=872 bgcolor=#fefefe
| 582872 ||  || — || November 17, 2011 || Mount Lemmon || Mount Lemmon Survey ||  || align=right data-sort-value="0.57" | 570 m || 
|-id=873 bgcolor=#fefefe
| 582873 ||  || — || January 4, 2016 || Haleakala || Pan-STARRS ||  || align=right data-sort-value="0.76" | 760 m || 
|-id=874 bgcolor=#E9E9E9
| 582874 ||  || — || January 4, 2016 || Haleakala || Pan-STARRS ||  || align=right data-sort-value="0.98" | 980 m || 
|-id=875 bgcolor=#E9E9E9
| 582875 ||  || — || July 5, 2005 || Kitt Peak || Spacewatch ||  || align=right | 1.0 km || 
|-id=876 bgcolor=#d6d6d6
| 582876 ||  || — || May 20, 2012 || Mount Lemmon || Mount Lemmon Survey ||  || align=right | 2.9 km || 
|-id=877 bgcolor=#fefefe
| 582877 ||  || — || November 25, 2011 || Haleakala || Pan-STARRS ||  || align=right data-sort-value="0.60" | 600 m || 
|-id=878 bgcolor=#fefefe
| 582878 ||  || — || October 13, 2010 || Mount Lemmon || Mount Lemmon Survey ||  || align=right data-sort-value="0.73" | 730 m || 
|-id=879 bgcolor=#fefefe
| 582879 ||  || — || November 16, 2003 || Kitt Peak || Spacewatch ||  || align=right data-sort-value="0.67" | 670 m || 
|-id=880 bgcolor=#fefefe
| 582880 ||  || — || March 9, 2005 || Kitt Peak || Spacewatch ||  || align=right data-sort-value="0.89" | 890 m || 
|-id=881 bgcolor=#d6d6d6
| 582881 ||  || — || December 13, 2015 || Haleakala || Pan-STARRS ||  || align=right | 3.5 km || 
|-id=882 bgcolor=#E9E9E9
| 582882 ||  || — || January 19, 2012 || Haleakala || Pan-STARRS ||  || align=right data-sort-value="0.63" | 630 m || 
|-id=883 bgcolor=#E9E9E9
| 582883 ||  || — || September 28, 2014 || Haleakala || Pan-STARRS ||  || align=right data-sort-value="0.94" | 940 m || 
|-id=884 bgcolor=#fefefe
| 582884 ||  || — || February 5, 2016 || Haleakala || Pan-STARRS ||  || align=right data-sort-value="0.47" | 470 m || 
|-id=885 bgcolor=#fefefe
| 582885 ||  || — || February 13, 2005 || La Silla || A. Boattini ||  || align=right data-sort-value="0.82" | 820 m || 
|-id=886 bgcolor=#E9E9E9
| 582886 ||  || — || March 15, 2012 || Mount Lemmon || Mount Lemmon Survey ||  || align=right data-sort-value="0.97" | 970 m || 
|-id=887 bgcolor=#fefefe
| 582887 ||  || — || September 4, 2010 || Mount Lemmon || Mount Lemmon Survey ||  || align=right data-sort-value="0.75" | 750 m || 
|-id=888 bgcolor=#E9E9E9
| 582888 ||  || — || February 29, 2004 || Kitt Peak || Spacewatch ||  || align=right data-sort-value="0.90" | 900 m || 
|-id=889 bgcolor=#E9E9E9
| 582889 ||  || — || March 16, 2008 || Kitt Peak || Spacewatch ||  || align=right data-sort-value="0.74" | 740 m || 
|-id=890 bgcolor=#E9E9E9
| 582890 ||  || — || June 5, 2005 || Kitt Peak || Spacewatch ||  || align=right | 1.2 km || 
|-id=891 bgcolor=#fefefe
| 582891 ||  || — || October 15, 2001 || Palomar || NEAT ||  || align=right data-sort-value="0.76" | 760 m || 
|-id=892 bgcolor=#fefefe
| 582892 ||  || — || March 27, 2009 || Mount Lemmon || Mount Lemmon Survey ||  || align=right data-sort-value="0.88" | 880 m || 
|-id=893 bgcolor=#E9E9E9
| 582893 ||  || — || February 29, 2012 || Mount Lemmon || Mount Lemmon Survey ||  || align=right data-sort-value="0.80" | 800 m || 
|-id=894 bgcolor=#fefefe
| 582894 ||  || — || January 2, 2012 || Mount Lemmon || Mount Lemmon Survey ||  || align=right data-sort-value="0.69" | 690 m || 
|-id=895 bgcolor=#fefefe
| 582895 ||  || — || November 22, 2011 || Mount Lemmon || Mount Lemmon Survey ||  || align=right data-sort-value="0.68" | 680 m || 
|-id=896 bgcolor=#fefefe
| 582896 ||  || — || March 13, 2005 || Kitt Peak || Spacewatch ||  || align=right data-sort-value="0.68" | 680 m || 
|-id=897 bgcolor=#fefefe
| 582897 ||  || — || August 20, 2014 || Haleakala || Pan-STARRS ||  || align=right data-sort-value="0.58" | 580 m || 
|-id=898 bgcolor=#FA8072
| 582898 ||  || — || December 21, 2006 || Kitt Peak || L. H. Wasserman ||  || align=right data-sort-value="0.32" | 320 m || 
|-id=899 bgcolor=#fefefe
| 582899 ||  || — || March 29, 2009 || Kitt Peak || Spacewatch ||  || align=right data-sort-value="0.73" | 730 m || 
|-id=900 bgcolor=#fefefe
| 582900 ||  || — || January 3, 2016 || Haleakala || Pan-STARRS ||  || align=right data-sort-value="0.63" | 630 m || 
|}

582901–583000 

|-bgcolor=#fefefe
| 582901 ||  || — || December 27, 2011 || Kitt Peak || Spacewatch ||  || align=right data-sort-value="0.82" | 820 m || 
|-id=902 bgcolor=#fefefe
| 582902 ||  || — || December 30, 2011 || Mount Lemmon || Mount Lemmon Survey ||  || align=right data-sort-value="0.86" | 860 m || 
|-id=903 bgcolor=#fefefe
| 582903 ||  || — || January 8, 2016 || Haleakala || Pan-STARRS ||  || align=right data-sort-value="0.65" | 650 m || 
|-id=904 bgcolor=#fefefe
| 582904 ||  || — || July 31, 2014 || Haleakala || Pan-STARRS ||  || align=right data-sort-value="0.79" | 790 m || 
|-id=905 bgcolor=#fefefe
| 582905 ||  || — || September 1, 2014 || Mount Lemmon || Mount Lemmon Survey ||  || align=right data-sort-value="0.74" | 740 m || 
|-id=906 bgcolor=#fefefe
| 582906 ||  || — || November 13, 2007 || Kitt Peak || Spacewatch ||  || align=right data-sort-value="0.90" | 900 m || 
|-id=907 bgcolor=#E9E9E9
| 582907 ||  || — || December 9, 2015 || Haleakala || Pan-STARRS ||  || align=right | 1.6 km || 
|-id=908 bgcolor=#fefefe
| 582908 ||  || — || April 15, 2005 || Kitt Peak || Spacewatch ||  || align=right data-sort-value="0.79" | 790 m || 
|-id=909 bgcolor=#E9E9E9
| 582909 ||  || — || January 4, 2016 || Haleakala || Pan-STARRS ||  || align=right data-sort-value="0.98" | 980 m || 
|-id=910 bgcolor=#fefefe
| 582910 ||  || — || November 17, 2011 || Piszkesteto || A. Farkas ||  || align=right data-sort-value="0.94" | 940 m || 
|-id=911 bgcolor=#E9E9E9
| 582911 ||  || — || February 24, 2012 || Haleakala || Pan-STARRS ||  || align=right | 1.1 km || 
|-id=912 bgcolor=#fefefe
| 582912 ||  || — || September 24, 2011 || Mount Lemmon || Mount Lemmon Survey ||  || align=right data-sort-value="0.52" | 520 m || 
|-id=913 bgcolor=#E9E9E9
| 582913 ||  || — || June 7, 2012 || Haleakala || Pan-STARRS ||  || align=right | 1.2 km || 
|-id=914 bgcolor=#fefefe
| 582914 ||  || — || October 14, 2007 || Mount Lemmon || Mount Lemmon Survey ||  || align=right data-sort-value="0.61" | 610 m || 
|-id=915 bgcolor=#E9E9E9
| 582915 ||  || — || February 28, 2012 || Haleakala || Pan-STARRS ||  || align=right | 1.3 km || 
|-id=916 bgcolor=#fefefe
| 582916 ||  || — || January 16, 2005 || Mauna Kea || Mauna Kea Obs. || MAS || align=right data-sort-value="0.65" | 650 m || 
|-id=917 bgcolor=#E9E9E9
| 582917 ||  || — || August 28, 2005 || Anderson Mesa || LONEOS ||  || align=right | 1.0 km || 
|-id=918 bgcolor=#E9E9E9
| 582918 ||  || — || March 13, 2008 || Kitt Peak || Spacewatch ||  || align=right data-sort-value="0.67" | 670 m || 
|-id=919 bgcolor=#fefefe
| 582919 ||  || — || April 11, 2005 || Mount Lemmon || Mount Lemmon Survey || MAS || align=right data-sort-value="0.70" | 700 m || 
|-id=920 bgcolor=#d6d6d6
| 582920 ||  || — || January 29, 2003 || Apache Point || SDSS Collaboration || 7:4 || align=right | 3.4 km || 
|-id=921 bgcolor=#fefefe
| 582921 ||  || — || September 14, 2006 || Mauna Kea || J. Masiero, R. Jedicke ||  || align=right data-sort-value="0.66" | 660 m || 
|-id=922 bgcolor=#fefefe
| 582922 ||  || — || February 9, 2016 || Haleakala || Pan-STARRS ||  || align=right data-sort-value="0.64" | 640 m || 
|-id=923 bgcolor=#E9E9E9
| 582923 ||  || — || March 26, 2008 || Mount Lemmon || Mount Lemmon Survey ||  || align=right data-sort-value="0.61" | 610 m || 
|-id=924 bgcolor=#fefefe
| 582924 ||  || — || August 30, 2014 || Catalina || CSS ||  || align=right | 1.1 km || 
|-id=925 bgcolor=#E9E9E9
| 582925 ||  || — || August 23, 2014 || Haleakala || Pan-STARRS ||  || align=right data-sort-value="0.87" | 870 m || 
|-id=926 bgcolor=#E9E9E9
| 582926 ||  || — || August 19, 2001 || Cerro Tololo || Cerro Tololo Obs. ||  || align=right data-sort-value="0.68" | 680 m || 
|-id=927 bgcolor=#fefefe
| 582927 ||  || — || January 18, 2008 || Kitt Peak || Spacewatch ||  || align=right data-sort-value="0.65" | 650 m || 
|-id=928 bgcolor=#E9E9E9
| 582928 ||  || — || February 23, 2012 || Mount Graham || R. P. Boyle, V. Laugalys ||  || align=right data-sort-value="0.82" | 820 m || 
|-id=929 bgcolor=#fefefe
| 582929 ||  || — || February 1, 2012 || Kitt Peak || Spacewatch ||  || align=right data-sort-value="0.85" | 850 m || 
|-id=930 bgcolor=#fefefe
| 582930 ||  || — || September 2, 2014 || Haleakala || Pan-STARRS ||  || align=right data-sort-value="0.72" | 720 m || 
|-id=931 bgcolor=#E9E9E9
| 582931 ||  || — || February 13, 2008 || Mount Lemmon || Mount Lemmon Survey ||  || align=right data-sort-value="0.96" | 960 m || 
|-id=932 bgcolor=#E9E9E9
| 582932 ||  || — || March 27, 2008 || Mount Lemmon || Mount Lemmon Survey ||  || align=right | 1.3 km || 
|-id=933 bgcolor=#E9E9E9
| 582933 ||  || — || June 7, 2013 || Oukaimeden || M. Ory ||  || align=right data-sort-value="0.99" | 990 m || 
|-id=934 bgcolor=#E9E9E9
| 582934 ||  || — || April 17, 2012 || Kitt Peak || Spacewatch ||  || align=right data-sort-value="0.97" | 970 m || 
|-id=935 bgcolor=#E9E9E9
| 582935 ||  || — || February 11, 1999 || Socorro || LINEAR ||  || align=right | 1.7 km || 
|-id=936 bgcolor=#fefefe
| 582936 ||  || — || June 24, 2005 || Palomar || NEAT || NYS || align=right data-sort-value="0.78" | 780 m || 
|-id=937 bgcolor=#E9E9E9
| 582937 ||  || — || April 7, 2003 || Socorro || LINEAR ||  || align=right | 1.5 km || 
|-id=938 bgcolor=#E9E9E9
| 582938 ||  || — || April 25, 2012 || Mount Lemmon || Mount Lemmon Survey ||  || align=right | 2.1 km || 
|-id=939 bgcolor=#E9E9E9
| 582939 ||  || — || February 11, 2016 || Haleakala || Pan-STARRS ||  || align=right | 1.6 km || 
|-id=940 bgcolor=#E9E9E9
| 582940 ||  || — || January 29, 1995 || Kitt Peak || Spacewatch ||  || align=right | 1.3 km || 
|-id=941 bgcolor=#E9E9E9
| 582941 ||  || — || February 11, 2016 || Haleakala || Pan-STARRS ||  || align=right data-sort-value="0.92" | 920 m || 
|-id=942 bgcolor=#fefefe
| 582942 ||  || — || February 1, 2012 || Mount Lemmon || Mount Lemmon Survey ||  || align=right data-sort-value="0.73" | 730 m || 
|-id=943 bgcolor=#E9E9E9
| 582943 ||  || — || September 25, 2008 || Mount Lemmon || Mount Lemmon Survey ||  || align=right | 1.7 km || 
|-id=944 bgcolor=#E9E9E9
| 582944 ||  || — || December 14, 2010 || Mount Lemmon || Mount Lemmon Survey ||  || align=right data-sort-value="0.98" | 980 m || 
|-id=945 bgcolor=#E9E9E9
| 582945 ||  || — || November 13, 2010 || Kitt Peak || Spacewatch ||  || align=right data-sort-value="0.99" | 990 m || 
|-id=946 bgcolor=#E9E9E9
| 582946 ||  || — || January 9, 2016 || Haleakala || Pan-STARRS ||  || align=right | 1.5 km || 
|-id=947 bgcolor=#E9E9E9
| 582947 ||  || — || January 16, 2016 || Haleakala || Pan-STARRS ||  || align=right | 1.1 km || 
|-id=948 bgcolor=#E9E9E9
| 582948 ||  || — || December 9, 2010 || Mount Lemmon || Mount Lemmon Survey ||  || align=right | 1.1 km || 
|-id=949 bgcolor=#E9E9E9
| 582949 ||  || — || January 14, 1994 || Kitt Peak || Spacewatch ||  || align=right | 1.6 km || 
|-id=950 bgcolor=#fefefe
| 582950 ||  || — || August 30, 2014 || Haleakala || Pan-STARRS || H || align=right data-sort-value="0.55" | 550 m || 
|-id=951 bgcolor=#fefefe
| 582951 ||  || — || February 12, 2016 || Haleakala || Pan-STARRS || H || align=right data-sort-value="0.52" | 520 m || 
|-id=952 bgcolor=#E9E9E9
| 582952 ||  || — || February 4, 2016 || Haleakala || Pan-STARRS ||  || align=right data-sort-value="0.77" | 770 m || 
|-id=953 bgcolor=#E9E9E9
| 582953 ||  || — || November 27, 2006 || Mount Lemmon || Mount Lemmon Survey ||  || align=right | 1.3 km || 
|-id=954 bgcolor=#E9E9E9
| 582954 ||  || — || March 10, 2003 || Palomar || NEAT ||  || align=right | 1.7 km || 
|-id=955 bgcolor=#E9E9E9
| 582955 ||  || — || February 10, 2011 || Mount Lemmon || Mount Lemmon Survey ||  || align=right | 1.5 km || 
|-id=956 bgcolor=#E9E9E9
| 582956 ||  || — || September 26, 2014 || Mount Lemmon || Mount Lemmon Survey ||  || align=right | 2.4 km || 
|-id=957 bgcolor=#E9E9E9
| 582957 ||  || — || April 20, 2012 || Kitt Peak || Spacewatch ||  || align=right | 1.4 km || 
|-id=958 bgcolor=#E9E9E9
| 582958 ||  || — || February 11, 2016 || Haleakala || Pan-STARRS ||  || align=right data-sort-value="0.78" | 780 m || 
|-id=959 bgcolor=#E9E9E9
| 582959 ||  || — || July 26, 2008 || Siding Spring || SSS ||  || align=right | 1.8 km || 
|-id=960 bgcolor=#E9E9E9
| 582960 ||  || — || February 11, 2008 || Mount Lemmon || Mount Lemmon Survey ||  || align=right data-sort-value="0.71" | 710 m || 
|-id=961 bgcolor=#E9E9E9
| 582961 ||  || — || March 5, 2012 || Kitt Peak || Spacewatch ||  || align=right data-sort-value="0.94" | 940 m || 
|-id=962 bgcolor=#E9E9E9
| 582962 ||  || — || March 15, 2008 || Mount Lemmon || Mount Lemmon Survey ||  || align=right data-sort-value="0.86" | 860 m || 
|-id=963 bgcolor=#fefefe
| 582963 ||  || — || February 2, 2008 || Mount Lemmon || Mount Lemmon Survey ||  || align=right data-sort-value="0.79" | 790 m || 
|-id=964 bgcolor=#E9E9E9
| 582964 ||  || — || February 11, 2016 || Haleakala || Pan-STARRS ||  || align=right data-sort-value="0.79" | 790 m || 
|-id=965 bgcolor=#E9E9E9
| 582965 ||  || — || February 7, 2002 || Palomar || NEAT ||  || align=right | 1.9 km || 
|-id=966 bgcolor=#fefefe
| 582966 ||  || — || April 20, 2009 || Mount Lemmon || Mount Lemmon Survey ||  || align=right data-sort-value="0.84" | 840 m || 
|-id=967 bgcolor=#E9E9E9
| 582967 ||  || — || September 10, 2013 || Haleakala || Pan-STARRS ||  || align=right | 1.6 km || 
|-id=968 bgcolor=#E9E9E9
| 582968 ||  || — || August 14, 2013 || Haleakala || Pan-STARRS ||  || align=right data-sort-value="0.89" | 890 m || 
|-id=969 bgcolor=#fefefe
| 582969 ||  || — || October 16, 2003 || Kitt Peak || Spacewatch ||  || align=right data-sort-value="0.67" | 670 m || 
|-id=970 bgcolor=#E9E9E9
| 582970 ||  || — || November 3, 2010 || Mount Lemmon || Mount Lemmon Survey ||  || align=right data-sort-value="0.67" | 670 m || 
|-id=971 bgcolor=#E9E9E9
| 582971 ||  || — || July 25, 2012 || Sandlot || G. Hug ||  || align=right | 2.2 km || 
|-id=972 bgcolor=#E9E9E9
| 582972 ||  || — || February 16, 2012 || Mayhill-ISON || L. Elenin ||  || align=right | 1.2 km || 
|-id=973 bgcolor=#E9E9E9
| 582973 ||  || — || February 4, 2016 || Haleakala || Pan-STARRS ||  || align=right data-sort-value="0.63" | 630 m || 
|-id=974 bgcolor=#E9E9E9
| 582974 ||  || — || March 15, 2012 || Mount Lemmon || Mount Lemmon Survey ||  || align=right data-sort-value="0.67" | 670 m || 
|-id=975 bgcolor=#E9E9E9
| 582975 ||  || — || February 27, 2012 || Haleakala || Pan-STARRS ||  || align=right data-sort-value="0.75" | 750 m || 
|-id=976 bgcolor=#E9E9E9
| 582976 ||  || — || February 29, 2008 || Kitt Peak || Spacewatch ||  || align=right data-sort-value="0.92" | 920 m || 
|-id=977 bgcolor=#E9E9E9
| 582977 ||  || — || September 21, 2001 || Apache Point || SDSS Collaboration ||  || align=right data-sort-value="0.96" | 960 m || 
|-id=978 bgcolor=#E9E9E9
| 582978 ||  || — || April 29, 2003 || Kitt Peak || Spacewatch ||  || align=right | 1.4 km || 
|-id=979 bgcolor=#E9E9E9
| 582979 ||  || — || February 5, 2016 || Haleakala || Pan-STARRS ||  || align=right | 1.3 km || 
|-id=980 bgcolor=#E9E9E9
| 582980 ||  || — || January 27, 2011 || Mount Lemmon || Mount Lemmon Survey ||  || align=right | 1.2 km || 
|-id=981 bgcolor=#E9E9E9
| 582981 ||  || — || December 13, 2010 || Mount Lemmon || Mount Lemmon Survey ||  || align=right | 1.3 km || 
|-id=982 bgcolor=#E9E9E9
| 582982 ||  || — || August 12, 2013 || Haleakala || Pan-STARRS ||  || align=right | 1.1 km || 
|-id=983 bgcolor=#E9E9E9
| 582983 ||  || — || February 21, 2007 || Kitt Peak || Spacewatch ||  || align=right | 1.0 km || 
|-id=984 bgcolor=#E9E9E9
| 582984 ||  || — || November 27, 2014 || Haleakala || Pan-STARRS ||  || align=right | 1.4 km || 
|-id=985 bgcolor=#E9E9E9
| 582985 ||  || — || February 25, 2012 || Kitt Peak || Spacewatch ||  || align=right data-sort-value="0.72" | 720 m || 
|-id=986 bgcolor=#E9E9E9
| 582986 ||  || — || October 3, 2013 || Haleakala || Pan-STARRS ||  || align=right | 1.3 km || 
|-id=987 bgcolor=#E9E9E9
| 582987 ||  || — || February 21, 2003 || Palomar || NEAT ||  || align=right | 1.5 km || 
|-id=988 bgcolor=#E9E9E9
| 582988 ||  || — || November 21, 2014 || Mount Lemmon || Mount Lemmon Survey ||  || align=right data-sort-value="0.75" | 750 m || 
|-id=989 bgcolor=#E9E9E9
| 582989 ||  || — || December 29, 2014 || Haleakala || Pan-STARRS ||  || align=right | 1.0 km || 
|-id=990 bgcolor=#E9E9E9
| 582990 ||  || — || April 14, 2008 || Kitt Peak || Spacewatch ||  || align=right data-sort-value="0.81" | 810 m || 
|-id=991 bgcolor=#E9E9E9
| 582991 ||  || — || January 4, 2011 || Mount Lemmon || Mount Lemmon Survey ||  || align=right | 1.3 km || 
|-id=992 bgcolor=#E9E9E9
| 582992 ||  || — || February 10, 2011 || Mount Lemmon || Mount Lemmon Survey ||  || align=right | 1.8 km || 
|-id=993 bgcolor=#E9E9E9
| 582993 ||  || — || February 9, 2015 || Mount Lemmon || Mount Lemmon Survey ||  || align=right | 2.0 km || 
|-id=994 bgcolor=#E9E9E9
| 582994 ||  || — || December 27, 2014 || Haleakala || Pan-STARRS ||  || align=right | 1.5 km || 
|-id=995 bgcolor=#E9E9E9
| 582995 ||  || — || August 15, 2013 || Haleakala || Pan-STARRS ||  || align=right data-sort-value="0.99" | 990 m || 
|-id=996 bgcolor=#E9E9E9
| 582996 ||  || — || December 10, 2010 || Mount Lemmon || Mount Lemmon Survey ||  || align=right | 1.4 km || 
|-id=997 bgcolor=#E9E9E9
| 582997 ||  || — || August 12, 2013 || Haleakala || Pan-STARRS ||  || align=right | 1.4 km || 
|-id=998 bgcolor=#E9E9E9
| 582998 ||  || — || June 20, 2012 || ESA OGS || ESA OGS ||  || align=right | 1.2 km || 
|-id=999 bgcolor=#E9E9E9
| 582999 ||  || — || February 11, 2016 || Haleakala || Pan-STARRS ||  || align=right | 1.6 km || 
|-id=000 bgcolor=#E9E9E9
| 583000 ||  || — || February 11, 2016 || Haleakala || Pan-STARRS ||  || align=right data-sort-value="0.97" | 970 m || 
|}

References

External links 
 Discovery Circumstances: Numbered Minor Planets (580001)–(585000) (IAU Minor Planet Center)

0582